This is a partial list of notable Polish or Polish-speaking or -writing people. People of partial Polish heritage have their respective ancestries credited.

Science

Physics 

 Czesław Białobrzeski
 Andrzej Buras
 Georges Charpak, 1995 Nobel Prize
 Jan Kazimierz Danysz
 Marian Danysz
 Tomasz Dietl
 Maria Dworzecka
 Artur Ekert, one of the independent inventors (in 1991) of quantum cryptography
 Marek Gazdzicki
 Ryszard Horodecki
 Leopold Infeld
 Aleksander Jabłoński
 Jerzy Stanisław Janicki
 Sylwester Kaliski
 Elżbieta Kossecka
 Jan Eugeniusz Krysiński
 Stanislas Leibler
 Maciej Lewenstein
 Olga Malinkiewicz
 Albert A. Michelson, 1907 Nobel Prize
 Lidia Morawska
 Stanisław Mrozowski
 Władysław Natanson
 Witold Nazarewicz
 Henryk Niewodniczański
 Georges Nomarski
 Karol Olszewski
 Jerzy Plebański
 Jerzy Pniewski
 Nikodem Popławski
 Sylwester Porowski, blue laser
 Józef Rotblat, 1995 Nobel Peace Prize
 Stefan Rozental
 Wojciech Rubinowicz
 Maria Skłodowska Curie (Marie Curie), two Nobel Prizes
 Jan Sładkowski
 Marian Smoluchowski, kinetic theory, Einstein–Smoluchowski relation
 Andrzej Sobolewski
 Haroun Tazieff, geologist, volcanologist, cinematographer, writer and French Cabinet minister
 Andrzej Trautman
 Witelo, philosopher, medieval optics
 August Witkowski
 Stanley Wojcicki
 Mieczysław Wolfke
 Stanisław Lech Woronowicz
 Zygmunt Wróblewski
 Marek Żukowski
 Wojciech H. Zurek

Chemistry 

 Osman Achmatowicz
 Józef Boguski
 Kazimierz Boratyński
 Jan Czochralski, modern semiconductors
 Emil Czyrniański
 Tadeusz Estreicher, cryogenics pioneer
 Kazimierz Fajans
 Kazimierz Funk, biochemist, the concept of vitamins
 Andrzej Górak
 Antoni Grabowski
 Konstanty Hrynakowski
 Andrzej Jajszczyk
 Alina Kabata-Pendias
 Aharon Katzir, electrochemistry of biopolymers
 Wiktor Kemula
 Włodzimierz Kołos
 Stanisław Kostanecki
 Marek Gatty-Kostyal
 Ignacy Łukasiewicz, inventor of kerosene lamp
 Mieczysław Mąkosza
 Leon Marchlewski
 Bolesław Masłowski
 Krzysztof Matyjaszewski
 Mark Miodownik, materials scientist and engineer
 Ignacy Mościcki
 Marceli Nencki
 Karol Olszewski
 Krzysztof Palczewski
 Sylwester Porowski
 Tadeusz Reichstein, Nobel Prize winner
 Michał Sędziwój, Latinized as Sendivogius: alchemist, physician, discoverer of oxygen
 Zuzanna S. Siwy
 Maria Skłodowska Curie (Marie Curie), two-time Nobel Prize winner
 Edward Sucharda
 Jędrzej Śniadecki
 Wojciech Świętosławski, "father of thermochemistry"
 Bohdan Szyszkowski
 Włodzimierz Trzebiatowski
 Filip Neriusz Walter, pioneer of organic chemistry
 Zygmunt Wróblewski
 Józef Zawadzki

Biology, medicine 

 Joseph Babinski, neurologist, discoverer of the Babinski reflex
 Gabriela Balicka-Iwanowska, botanist
 Edmund Biernacki, physician, discoverer of erythrocyte sedimentation rate
 Czesław Bieżanko, entomologist
 Jan Biziel, physician, social activist
 Tytus Chałubiński, physician
 Napoleon Cybulski, neurophysiologist, discoverer of adrenaline
 Maria Antonina Czaplicka, anthropologist
 Jan Czekanowski, anthropologist
 Kazimierz Dąbrowski, psychiatrist, creator of the theory of positive disintegration
 Wiktor Dega, surgeon
 August Dehnel, biologist
 Jozef Dietl, physician
 Hermann Dietz, physician, senator of the Republic of Poland, social activist
 Jan Dzierżon, zoologist, apiarist
 Stefan Falimierz, physician, herbalist
 Sidney Farber, pathologist and cancer biologist, founder of the Dana–Farber Cancer Institute
 Edward Flatau, neurologist
 Ludwik Fleck, microbiologist, philosopher of science
 Eva Frommer, child psychiatrist and anthroposophist
 Kazimierz Funk, coined the term vitamin
 Marian Gieszczykiewicz, physician
 Emil Godlewski, embryologist
 Samuel Goldflam, neurologist
 Adam Gruca, surgeon
 Ryszard Gryglewski, pharmacologist, physician
 Tomasz Guzik, physician
 Ludwik Hirszfeld, microbiologist
 Janina Hurynowicz, neurophysiologist
 Feliks Paweł Jarocki, zoologist
 Stefania Jabłońska, dermatologist
 Walery Jaworski, physician
 Konstanty Jelski, ornithologist
 Zbigniew Kabata, biologist
 Ewa Kamler, biologist
 Zofia Kielan-Jaworowska, paleobiologist
 Aleksander Koj, physician, scientist
 Jerzy Konorski, neurophysiologist
 Stefan Kopec, biologist
 Hilary Koprowski, polio vaccine
 Tadeusz Krwawicz, medical pioneer
 Elwira Lisowska, biochemist
 Abraham Low, neuropsychiatrist
 Margaret Lowenfeld, paediatrician and pioneer of Sandplay Therapy
 Liliana Lubińska, neuroscientist
 Karol Marcinkowski, physician
 Eugène Minkowski, psychiatrist influenced by Bergson and phenomenology
 Ludwik Mlokosiewicz, botanist
 Maksymilian Nowicki, biologist
 Ferdynand Antoni Ossendowski, biologist
 Marek Pienkowski, immunologist
 Piotr Ponikowski, cardiologist
 Moshe Prywes (1914-1998), Israeli physician and educator; first President of Ben-Gurion University of the Negev
 Tadeusz Reichstein, Polish-Swiss physiologist; 1950 Nobel Laureate in Physiology or Medicine
 Zbigniew Religa, cardiologist
 Józef Rostafiński, biologist
 Albert Sabin, polio vaccine; President of the Weizmann Institute of Science 
 Andrzej Wiktor Schally, Nobel-laureate endocrinologist
 Hanna Segal, leading Kleinian psychoanalyst
 Michael Sela (born 1924), Israeli immunologist; President of the Weizmann Institute of Science
 Henryk Skarżyński, otolaryngologist, audiologist, phoniatrist
 Michalina Stefanowska, neurophysiologist
 Eduard Adolf Strasburger (born in Poland, of German descent), botanist
 Andrzej Szczeklik, immunologist
 Jan Sztolcman, ornithologist
 Wacław Szybalski, physician
 Władysław Taczanowski, zoologist
 Andrzej K. Tarkowski, embryologist
 Zbylut Twardowski, physician
 Jerzy Vetulani, neuroscientist, pharmacologist and biochemist
 Emil Warmiński, physician, social and national activist
 Józef Warszewicz, botanist
 Rudolf Weigl, typhus vaccine
 Wanda Wesołowska, zoologist
 Helena Rosa Wright, physician influential in family planning
 Marie Elizabeth Zakrzewska, physician
 Jozef J. Zwislocki, neuroscientist

Astronomy 

 Franciszek Armiński
 Tadeusz Banachiewicz
 Jan Brożek
 Albert Brudzewski
 Nicolaus Copernicus, known for the heliocentric theory
 Wojciech Dziembowski
 Władysław Dziewulski
 Michał Falkener
 Jan Gadomski
 Johannes Hevelius (Jan Heweliusz)
 Felicjan Kępiński
 Marian Albertovich Kowalski
 Kazimierz Kordylewski
 Wojciech Krzemiński
 Jan Latosz
 Stanisław Lubieniecki
 Bohdan Paczyński
 Marcin Poczobutt-Odlanicki
 Alexius Sylvius Polonus
 Adam Prażmowski
 Antoni Przybylski
 Agata Różańska
 Konrad Rudnicki
 Jan Mikołaj Smogulecki
 Jan Śniadecki
 Andrzej Udalski
 Wiesław Wiśniewski
 Aleksander Wolszczan, first discovery of extrasolar planets
 Thomas Zebrowski
 Anna N. Żytkow

Mathematics 

 Nachman Aronszajn
 Michel Balinski
 Stefan Banach
 Tadeusz Banachiewicz
 Kazimierz Bartel
 Andrzej Białynicki-Birula
 Karol Borsuk
 Jacob Bronowski
 Jan Brożek
 Meier Eidelheit
 Samuel Eilenberg
 Andrzej Grzegorczyk
 Witold Hurewicz
 Henryk Iwaniec
 Zygmunt Janiszewski
 Stanisław Jaśkowski
 Jan Jaworowski
 Mark Kac
 Stefan Kaczmarz
 Marek Karpinski, computer scientist
 Bronisław Knaster
 Kazimierz Kordylewski
 Robert Kowalski
 Zdzisław Krygowski
 Krystyna Kuperberg
 Włodzimierz Kuperberg
 Kazimierz Kuratowski
 Izabella Łaba
 Franciszek Leja
 Stanisław Leśniewski
 Adolf Lindenbaum
 Stanisław Łojasiewicz
 Antoni Łomnicki
 Jerzy Łoś
 Jan Łukasiewicz, logician, inventor of the parenthesis-free Polish Notation
 Edward Marczewski
 Józef Marcinkiewicz
 Stanisław Mazur
 Stefan Mazurkiewicz
 Jan Mikusinski
 Michał Misiurewicz
 Andrzej Mostowski
 Jan Mycielski
 Jerzy Spława-Neyman
 Otton M. Nikodym
 Wiesława Nizioł
 Andrew Odlyzko
 Władysław Orlicz
 Józef H. Przytycki
 Helena Rasiowa
 Marian Rejewski, mathematician-cryptologist who broke the German Enigma cipher
 Jerzy Różycki, Enigma-breaker
 Stanisław Ruziewicz
 Czesław Ryll-Nardzewski
 Stanisław Saks
 Wojciech Samotij
 Juliusz Schauder
 Wacław Sierpiński
 Roman Sikorski
 Julian Sochocki
 Hugo Steinhaus
 Włodzimierz Stożek
 Wanda Szmielew
 Władysław Ślebodziński
 Ivan Śleszyński
 Jan Śniadecki
 Alfred Tarski
 Adam Henryk Toruńczyk
 Stanisław Ulam, co-designer (with Edward Teller) of the hydrogen bomb
 Kazimierz Urbanik
 Tadeusz Ważewski
 Józef Hoene-Wroński
 Kazimierz Zarankiewicz
 Stanisław Zaremba
 Henryk Zygalski, Enigma-breaker
 Antoni Zygmund
 Kazimierz Żorawski

Computer science 

 Krzysztof R. Apt
 Paul Baran
 Krzysztof Cios
 Andrzej Ehrenfeucht
 Siemion Fajtlowicz, known for his Graffiti
 Tomasz Imieliński
 Piotr Indyk
 Jacek Karpiński
 Marek Karpiński
 Marian Mazur
 Jan Mycielski
 Zdzislaw Pawlak 
 Emil Leon Post
 Stanisław Radziszowski
 Andrew Targowski
 Jack Tramiel
 Andrzej Trybulec, Mizar system
 Stanisław Ulam
 Jan Węglarz
 Michał Zalewski

Linguistics 

 Jolanta Antas
 Jerzy Bartmiński
 Jan Niecisław Baudouin de Courtenay (1845–1929), developed the theory of the phoneme and phonetic alternations.
 Andrzej Bogusławski, Russian-Polish-Russian lexicographer, philosopher of language, semioticist
 Aleksander Brückner (1856–1939), Slavicist and Polish-language lexicographer
 Kazimierz Bulas (1903–1970), Polish–English lexicographer (Kościuszko Foundation Dictionary)
 Jan Bystroń
 Jan Czekanowski
 Andrzej Gawroński
 Grzegorz Knapski
 Władysław Kopaliński
 Onufry Kopczyński, creator of Polish-grammar terminology
 Alfred Korzybski, originator of general semantics
 Mikołaj Kruszewski
 Jerzy Kuryłowicz
 Samuel Bogumił Linde, Polish language lexicographer
 Jan Mączyński
 Halina Mierzejewska
 Jan Miodek
 Iwo Cyprian Pogonowski (1921–2016), Polish–English lexicographer
 Anna Siewierska
 Jan Stanisławski, Polish–English lexicographer
 Antoni Józef Śmieszek
 Michel Thomas
 Zdzisław Wąsik
 Anna Wierzbicka
 L. L. Zamenhof, inventor of Esperanto

Invention 

 Bruno Abakanowicz, mathematician, engineer, inventor of the integraph
 Stefan Bryła, first welded road bridge
 Mieczysław G. Bekker, Lunar Roving Vehicle
 Jan Czochralski, Czochralski process
 Juliusz Bogdan Deczkowski, medical equipment
 Stefan Drzewiecki, first submarine
 Jan Dzierzon, first successful movable-frame beehive
 Leo Gerstenzang, Q-Tips
 Rudolf Gundlach, Gundlach Rotary Periscope
 Józef Hofmann, pneumatic shock absorbers
 Stefan Kudelski, Nagra audio recorders
 Stephanie Kwolek, inventor of Kevlar
 Kazimierz Leski, ballast tank funnels
 Janusz Liberkowski, Anecia Safety Capsule
 Ignacy Łukasiewicz, kerosene lamp, oil refinery
 Henryk Magnuski, walkie-talkie
 Julian Ochorowicz, precursor of radio and television
 Iwo Cyprian Pogonowski, petroleum-drilling platform inventor 
 Kazimierz Proszyński, cinematic camera
 Tadeusz Sendzimir, processing steel
 Władysław Starewicz, first puppet-animated film 
 Abraham Stern, first computing-machine and device for calculating the square roots of numbers
 Wacław Struszyński, seaborne direction finding antenna, which made a vital contribution to the defeat of U-boats in the Battle of the Atlantic
 Jan Szczepanik, television patents
 Józef Tykociński, sound film
 Stefan Tyszkiewicz, automotive and audio improvements
 Mieczysław Wolfke, precursor of holography
 Casimir Zeglen, bullet-proof vest
 Henryk Zygalski, Zygalski sheets

Engineering 

 Karol Adamiecki
 Krzysztof Arciszewski
 Mieczysław G. Bekker, first moon rover
 Stefan Bryła, first welded road bridge
 Romuald Cebertowicz, soil solidification
 Zdzisław Celiński
 Georges Charpak, particle detector
 Jerzy Dąbrowski, designer of PZL.37 Łoś bomber
 Mikhail Dolivo-Dobrovolsky, Polish-Russian engineer, electrician, and inventor
 Adam Freytag
 Rudolf Gundlach, tank designer
 Kazimierz Gzowski
 Edward Jan Habich
 Tytus Maksymilian Huber
 Jacek Jędruch
 Stanisław Kierbedź
 Stefan Kudelski, electronics engineer, inventor of the Nagra tape recorder
 Józef Kosacki, Polish mine detector
 Janusz Liberkowski, inventor
 Henryk Magnuski, walkie-talkie
 Ernest Malinowski, 19th-century constructor of Peru's Ferrovias Central, the world's highest railway at the time 
 Henry Millicer, aviation
 Ralph Modjeski, bridge designer
 Jan Nagórski, first man to fly over the North Pole
 Antoni Patek, pioneer in watchmaking and a creator of Patek Philippe & Co.
 Iwo Cyprian Pogonowski
 Zygmunt Puławski, designer of PZL P.11 fighter
 Bogdan Raczkowski, engineer and urbanist in Bydgoszcz
 Ludwik Regamey, engineer and social activist
 Wojciech Rostafiński, NASA
 Kazimierz Siemienowicz, pioneer of rocket
 Stefan Tyszkiewicz, automotive engineer, inventor of the airport luggage trolley 
 Stanisław Wigura, aviation
 Piotr Wilniewczyc, weaponry
 Franciszek Żwirko, aviation

Social sciences 

 Tadeusz Andrzejewski, archeologist, Egyptologist
 Zygmunt Bauman, sociologist, philosopher
 Stefan Błachowski, psychologist
 Maria Czaplicka, anthropologist
 Jan Władysław Dawid, psychologist
 Tomasz Drezner, Renaissance jurist
 Agnieszka Dudzińska, sociologist
 Barbara Engelking, sociologist
 Zygmunt Gloger, ethnographer, archaeologist, historian
 Ludwig Gumplowicz, a founder of sociology
 Norbert Guterman
 Alicja Iwańska, sociologist
 Franciszek Kasparek, jurist, professor of international law
 Oskar Kolberg, ethnographer
 Marek Kotański, psychologist
 Ludwik Krzywicki, anthropologist, economist, sociologist
 Jan Kubary, naturalist, ethnographer
 Hersch Lauterpacht, creator of the legal concept of crimes against humanity
 Raphael Lemkin, creator of the legal concept of genocide
 Wiesław Łukaszewski, psychologist
 Bronisław Malinowski, anthropologist
 Władysław Markiewicz, sociologist
 Kazimierz Michałowski, archeologist, Egyptologist
 Karol Myśliwiec, archeologist, Egyptologist
 Julian Ochorowicz, psychologist, philosopher, inventor
 Maria Ossowska, sociologist
 Stanisław Ossowski, sociologist
 Bronisław Piłsudski, cultural anthropologist
 Jadwiga Staniszkis, sociologist
 Paweł Śpiewak, sociologist
 Henryk Stroband, jurist and mayor of Toruń
 Jerzy Szacki, historian of ideas
 Zbigniew Szafrański, Egyptologist, archeologist
 Jacek Szmatka, sociologist
 Piotr Sztompka, sociologist
 Edmund Wnuk-Lipiński, sociologist, founder of PAN's Institute of Political Studies
 Florian Znaniecki, sociologist

Economics 

 Karol Adamiecki
 Leszek Balcerowicz
 Czesław Bobrowski
 Henryka Bochniarz
 Joanna Cygler
 Gabriel Czechowicz
 Franciszek Ksawery Drucki-Lubecki
 Zyta Gilowska
 Adam Glapiński
 Władysław Grabski
 Henryk Grossman
 Robert Gwiazdowski
 Leonid Hurwicz, 2007 Nobel Laureate
 Danuta Hübner
 Michał Kalecki
 Grzegorz Kołodko
 Monika Kostera
 Tadeusz Kowalik
 Stanisław Kronenberg
 Eugeniusz Kwiatkowski
 Ludwik Maurycy Landau
 Oskar Lange
 Janusz Lewandowski
 Edward Lipiński
 Kazimierz Łaski
 Grzegorz Marek Michalski
 Wacław Micuta
 Hilary Minc
 Marek Rocki
 Dariusz Rosati
 Jacek Rostowski
 Edward Szczepanik
 Sławomir Szwedowski
 Louis Wolowski
 Halina Wasilewska-Trenkner
 Antoni Żabko-Potopowicz

Other sciences 

 Henryk Arctowski, explorer of the Antarctic
 Leon Barszczewski, explorer
 Piotr Ignacy Bieńkowski, scholar, archaeologist, professor
 Karol Bohdanowicz, geologist
 Gerard Ciołek, architect and historian of gardens
 Aleksander Czekanowski, explorer of Siberia
 Jan Czerski, paleontologist, explorer of Siberia
 Zofia Daszyńska-Golińska, socialist politician, suffragist
 Kazimierz Dąbrowski, psychologist
 Helene Deutsch, psychoanalyst
 Antoni Bolesław Dobrowolski, geophysicist, meteorologist, polar explorer
 Ignacy Domeyko, geologist
 Benedykt Dybowski, naturalist, explorer of Siberia
 Gaspar da Gama, traveller, interpreter, explorer
 Bronisław Grąbczewski, explorer
 Mirosław Hermaszewski, the first Polish cosmonaut
 Anton Hoffmann, 19th century architect in Bydgoszcz
 Leonard Jaczewski, engineer, explorer of Asian Russia
 Maria Janion, critic and theoretician of literature, feminist
 Henryk Jordan, founding father of physical education
 Józefa Joteyko, physiologist, psychologist and pedagogue
 Rudolf Kern, Art Nouveau architect in Bydgoszcz
 Antoni Kępiński, psychiatrist
 Stefan Klajbor, architect
 Janusz Korczak, pedagogue, writer
 Jan Kossowski, modernist architect
 Józef Kostrzewski, archeologist, museologist
 Irena Krzywicka, feminst, writer, translator
 Henryk Lipszyc, specialist in Japanese culture, translator, ambassador of Poland in Tokyo
 Rosa Luxemburg, Marxist political theorist, socialist philosopher, and revolutionary
 Józef Morozewicz, mineralogist, petrographer
 Halszka Osmólska, paleontologist
 Jacek Pałkiewicz, journalist and explorer, best known for discovering the sources of the Amazon River
 Michael Alfred Peszke, psychiatrist
 Benedykt Polak (Benedict the Pole, Benedictus Polonus), explorer
 Jan Potocki, linguist, Egyptologist, sociologist, author of The Saragossa Manuscript
 Eugeniusz Romer, cartographer
 Antoni Józef Śmieszek, Egyptologist
 Józef Święcicki, 19th century architect
 Stanisław of Skarbimierz, political scientist
 Paweł Edmund Strzelecki, geologist, explorer of Australia
 Tadeusz Sulimirski, archeologist
 Józef Trzemeski, polar explorer
 Bernard Wapowski, "father of Polish cartography"
 Andrzej Wawrzyniak, diplomat, founder of the Asia and Pacific Museum in Warsaw
 Fritz Weidner, designer and architect in Bydgoszcz
 Paweł Włodkowic, jurist
 Robert Zajonc, psychologist
 Czesław Zakaszewski, hydrologist
 Kazimierz Żurowski, archaeologist

History 

 Roman Aftanazy, historian of former Eastern Borderlands and librarian
 Szymon Askenazy, historian and diplomat
 Marcin Bielski, chronicler
 Michał Bobrzyński, historian and politician
 Józef Borzyszkowski, Kashubian historian
 Filip Callimachus
 Alina Cała
 Marek Jan Chodakiewicz
 Piotr Cywiński
 Tadeusz Czacki
 Norman Davies, British-Polish historian
 Małgorzata Dąbrowska, historian, Byzantist
 Jan Długosz, 15th-century chronicler of Poland
 Maria Dzielska
 Marian Kamil Dziewanowski, Poland, Russia, modern Europe
 Karol Estreicher (senior), father of Polish Bibliography
 Stanisław Estreicher
 Tadeusz Estreicher
 Józef Feldman
 Mieczysław Gębarowicz, art historian, museum director, custodian of Ossolineum
 Aleksander Gieysztor
 Kazimierz Godłowski, historian and archeologist
 Władysław Grabski
 Roman Grodecki
 Oskar Halecki, historian of Poland
 Marceli Handelsman, historian of Poland
 Paweł Jasienica, historian of Poland
 Jacek Jędruch
 Wincenty Kadłubek, 13th-century historian of Poland
 Józef Kasparek, constitutions; World War II era
 Stefan Kieniewicz, 19th-century Polish history
 Jerzy Kirchmayer, 1944 Warsaw Uprising
 Jerzy Kolendo, archaeologist, epigraphist and historian of the Mediterranean Basin in antiquity
 Hugo Kołłątaj, 18th–19th-century historian, philosopher and politician
 Feliks Koneczny, Polish history, social philosophy
 Władysław Konopczyński, Polish and world history
 Stanisław Kot, historian, politician, diplomat
 Władysław Kozaczuk, military history, military intelligence, World War II
 Manfred Kridl, history of Polish culture and literature
 Marcin Kromer, 16th-century Bishop of Warmia, secretary to two Polish kings, and historian of Poland
 Jan Kucharzewski, historian and politician
 Marian Kukiel, military historian and politician
 Lucyna Kulińska
 Ewa Kurek
 Stanisław Kutrzeba, Poland, Polish law, Kraków
 Gerard Labuda
 Joachim Lelewel, historian of Poland
 Jerzy Jan Lerski
 Wacław Lipiński
 Stanisław Lorentz, art historian
 Czesław Madajczyk, World War II
 Janusz Magnuski, World War II Polish and Soviet armor
 Tadeusz Manteuffel, medievalist
 Maciej Masłowski, art historian
 Benjamin Mazar (1906–1995), Israeli historian and archeologist; President of the Hebrew University of Jerusalem
 Maciej Miechowita
 Lidia Milka-Wieczorkiewicz
 Karol Modzelewski
 Stephen Mizwa
 Teodor Narbutt, Polish historian of Lithuania
 Adam Naruszewicz, 18th-century historian, participant in the Great Sejm
 Kasper Niesiecki, Jesuit lexicographer and heraldic scholar
 Szymon Okolski, 17th-century historian
 Bartosz Paprocki, Polish and Czech heraldic scholar
 Michael Alfred Peszke, Polish Armed Forces, World War II
 Tadeusz Piotrowski, historian of Poland during World War II
 Richard Pipes, Polish-American historian of Russia and the Soviet Union
 Iwo Cyprian Pogonowski, World War II, Polish-Jewish relations
 Teresa Prekerowa
 Stanisław Salmonowicz, historian of law
 Henryk Samsonowicz, historian specializing in medieval Poland
 Konstancja Skirmuntt
 Julian Stachiewicz, military historian
 Szymon Starowolski
 Aneta Stawiszyńska
 Dariusz Stola
 Maciej Stryjkowski, historian, writer, poet
 Irena Strzelecka
 Tomasz Strzembosz, Polish World War II history
 Tadeusz Sulimirski, historian and archeologist
 Karol Szajnocha, historian and novelist
 Józef Szujski
 Zygmunt Szweykowski, Polish literature
 Władysław Tatarkiewicz, philosophy and aesthetics
 Rafał Taubenschlag, history of law
 Janusz Tazbir, historian, specializing in the culture and religion of Poland in the 16th and 17th centuries
 Józef Turowski, World War II OUN massacres of Poles
 Adam Ulam, Polish-American historian of Russia and the Soviet Union
 Adam Vetulani, history of law
 Piotr S. Wandycz, Polish-American historian of Central and Eastern Europe
 Leon Wasilewski
 Ewa Wipszycka, historian and papyrologist
 Richard Woytak, World War II era
 Julia Zabłocka (1931–1993), historian, classical scholar, archaeologist
 Wincenty Zakrzewski, 16th-century Poland
 Adam Zamoyski
 Janusz K. Zawodny, World War II
 Marek Żukow-Karczewski, historian and journalist

Philosophy 

 Adam of Łowicz
 Edward Abramowski
 Kazimierz Ajdukiewicz
 Zygmunt Bauman
 Stefan Błachowski
 Józef Maria Bocheński
 Anna Brożek
 Stanisław Brzozowski
 Adam Burski
 Piotr Chmielowski
 Leon Chwistek
 August Cieszkowski
 Edward Dembowski
 Anioł Dowgird
 Adolf Dygasiński
 Michał Falkener
 Ludwik Fleck, 20th-century philosopher of science
 Danuta Gierulanka
 Józef Gołuchowski
 Wawrzyniec Grzymała Goślicki
 Jakub Górski
 Grzegorz of Stawiszyn
 Joanna Hańderek
 Jan Hartman
 Władysław Heinrich
 Michał Heller
 Józef Maria Hoene-Wroński
 Janina Hosiasson-Lindenbaum
 Roman Ingarden
 Jakub of Gostynin
 Jan of Głogów
 Jan of Stobnica
 Józef Emanuel Jankowski
 Feliks Jaroński
 Stanisław Jaśkowski
 Jan Jonston
 Leszek Kołakowski
 Hugo Kołłątaj
 Alfred Korzybski
 Tadeusz Kotarbiński
 Władysław Mieczysław Kozłowski
 Józef Kremer
 Franciszek Krupiński
 Irena Lasota
 Katarzyna de Lazari-Radek
 Stanisław Leszczyński
 Stanisław Leśniewski
 Casimir Lewy
 Karol Libelt
 Wincenty Lutosławski
 Jan Łukasiewicz
 Kazimierz Łyszczyński
 Adam Mahrburg
 Ewa Majewska
 Marian Massonius
 Émile Meyerson
 Konstanty Michalski
 Wawrzyniec Mitzler de Kolof
 Andrzej Frycz Modrzewski
 Julian Ochorowicz
 Maria Ossowska
 Stefan Pawlicki
 Leon Petrażycki
 Sebastian Petrycy
 Bolesław Prus
 Adam Schaff
 Ulrich Schrade
 Barbara Skarga
 Stanisław Staszic
 Józef Supiński
 Józef Kalasanty Szaniawski
 Jan Szylling
 Krystyn Lach Szyrma
 Maria Szyszkowska
 Jan Śniadecki
 Jędrzej Śniadecki
 Magdalena Środa
 Aleksander Świętochowski
 Alfred Tarski
 Władysław Tatarkiewicz
 Józef Tischner
 Andrzej Towiański
 Bronisław Trentowski
 Anna-Teresa Tymieniecka
 Kazimierz Twardowski
 Michał Twaróg of Bystrzyków
 Vitello
 Józef Warszawski
 Władysław Weryho
 Michał Wiszniewski
 Stanisław Ignacy Witkiewicz (Witkacy)
 Władysław Witwicki
 Karol Wojtyla
 Jan Woleński
 Adam Ignacy Zabellewicz
 Marian Zdziechowski
 Eleonora Ziemięcka
 Czesław Znamierowski
 Florian Znaniecki

Prose literature 

 Franciszka Arnsztajnowa, playwright
 S. Ansky, Bielorussian, Polish-Jewish author of The Dybbuk
 Joanna Bator, novelist, feminist
 Witold Bełza, librarian, writer, publicist on Bydgoszcz
 Halina Birenbaum, Polish Israeli writer, translator, chronicler of the martyrdom of Polish Jewry
 Karol Olgierd Borchardt, maritime author
 Tadeusz Borowski, writer and journalist
 Tadeusz Boy-Żeleński, writer; translator of over 100 French literary classics
 Edmund Chojecki, journalist based in France
 Joanna Chmielewska, crime writer
 Sylwia Chutnik, novelist, feminist, social activist
 Joseph Conrad (Józef Teodor Konrad Korzeniowski), English-language novelist
 Stanisław Czerniecki, landowner and chef, author of the first Cookery book in Polish 1682
 Lucyna Ćwierczakiewiczowa, cookbook author
 Maria Dąbrowska, novelist and translator of the Diary of Samuel Pepys into Polish
 Johannes Dantiscus (Jan Dantyszek), Latin poet and Prince-Bishop of Warmia
 Jacek Dehnel, writer, poet, translator, painter
 Tadeusz Dołęga-Mostowicz, author of the novel, The Career of Nicodemus Dyzma
 Jacek Dukaj, science-fiction writer
 Adolf Dygasiński, novelist
 Leszek Engelking, short story writer
 Felicjan Medard Faleński, poet, novelist
 Aleksander Fredro, poet, comedy writer
 Jerzy Giedroyć, legendary émigré editor (Kultura)
 Janusz Głowacki, playwright, nonfiction author
 Ferdynand Goetel, novelist, playwright, essayist
 Witold Gombrowicz, novelist, playwright
 Stefan Grabiński, horror writer
 Mieczysław Grydzewski, legendary editor (Skamander, Wiadomości Literackie)
 Henryk Grynberg, writer
 Adam Grzymała-Siedlecki, literary and theater critic
 Józef Hen, novelist, essayist, playwright, screenwriter, and reporter
 Gustaw Herling-Grudziński, writer, journalist, essayist, World War II underground fighter
 Marek Hłasko, novelist, short story writer
 Klementyna Hoffmanowa, writer of memoir and children's literature
 Paweł Huelle, essayist
 Juliusz Kaden-Bandrowski
 Wincenty Kadłubek, political scientist, writer, chronicler
 Ryszard Kapuściński, writer and journalist
 Wojciech Karpiński, writer and essayist
 Maria Konopnicka, writer, novelist
 Tadeusz Konwicki, writer
 Janusz Korczak, writer, pedagogist
 Jerzy Kosiński, writer
 Zofia Kossak-Szczucka, novelist and World War II resistance fighter
 Marek Krajewski, crime writer, known for his series of novels set in pre-war Wrocław with Eberhard Mock as the protagonist
 Hanna Krall, writer
 Ignacy Krasicki, author of the first Polish novel, The Adventures of Mr. Nicholas Wisdom, and of Fables and Parables
 Józef Ignacy Kraszewski, extremely prolific historical-novelist
 Wojciech Kuczok, novelist, screenwriter, film critic
 Antoni Lange, writer, poet, philosopher
 Stanisław Lem, science-fiction writer, essayist, philosopher
 Stanisław Lubieniecki, writer, astronomer* Waldemar Łysiak, writer
 Józef Mackiewicz, writer, journalist
 Kornel Makuszyński, children's writer
 Dorota Masłowska, writer and playwright
 Juliusz Mieroszewski, publicist, translator of Orwell's 1984 into Polish
 Kazimierz Moczarski, writer and journalist
 Sławomir Mrożek, dramatist and writer
 Wiesław Myśliwski, novelist
 Anna Nakwaska, children's author and educationist
 Joanna Olczak-Ronikier, novelist
 Eliza Orzeszkowa, Positivist writer
 Ferdynand Antoni Ossendowski, writer
 Teodor Parnicki, historical novelist
 Jan Chryzostom Pasek, memoirist
 Sergiusz Piasecki, writer
 Krzysztof Piesiewicz, screenwriter and politician
 Jerzy Pilch, writer, columnist, journalist
 Jan Potocki, The Saragossa Manuscript
 Bolesław Prus, The Doll and Pharaoh
 Ksawery Pruszyński, writer and journalist
 Stanisława Przybyszewska
 Stanisław Przybyszewski, novelist, dramatist, and poet who wrote in both German and Polish
 Mikołaj Rej, a founder of Polish literary language and literature
 Małgorzata Rejmer, writer
 Sydor Rey, writer, poet, novelist
 Władysław Reymont, 1924 Nobel laureate
 Henryk Rzewuski, novelist
 Pinchas Sadeh, Israeli novelist and poet
 Barbara Sanguszko, enlightenment writer and salon hostess
 Andrzej Sapkowski, fantasy writer
 Sat-Okh, Polish-Shawnee writer
 Bruno Schulz, novelist and painter
 Henryk Sienkiewicz, 1905 Nobel laureate
 Isaac Bashevis Singer, 1978 Nobel laureate
 Piotr Skarga, poet, writer, humanist
 Andrzej Stasiuk, writer, journalist, literary critic
 Jędrzej Śniadecki, terminologist, writer
 Stefan Themerson, children's writer, film maker, inventor of "semantic poetry", philosopher
 Olga Tokarczuk, writer, psychologist, 2019 Nobel laureate
 Magdalena Tulli, novelist, translator
 Marian Turwid, writer and painter from Bydgoszcz
 Leopold Tyrmand, writer
 Meyer Wolf Weisgal, American journalist, publisher, and playwright; President of the Weizmann Institute of Science
 Józef Weyssenhoff, novelist, poet, literary critic
 Stanisław Ignacy Witkiewicz (Witkacy)
 Stanisław Wyspiański, painter and writer
 Franciszek Zabłocki, comic dramatist and satirist
 Janusz A. Zajdel, science-fiction writer
 Gabriela Zapolska, novelist
 Rafał A. Ziemkiewicz, political fiction and science-fiction writer
 Aleksandra Ziolkowska-Boehm, writer
 Antonina Żabińska, writer
 Stefan Żeromski, novelist
 Jerzy Żuławski, novelist

Journalism

Poetry 

 Guillaume Apollinaire, (Wilhelm Apolinary Kostrowicki)
 Franciszka Arnsztajnowa
 Adam Asnyk
 Krzysztof Kamil Baczyński
 Edward Balcerzan
 Stanisław Barańczak
 Miron Białoszewski
 Zbigniew Bieńkowski
 Biernat of Lublin
 Tadeusz Borowski
 Władysław Broniewski
 Jan Brzechwa
 Stanisław Korab-Brzozowski
 Teodor Bujnicki
 Andrzej Bursa
 Tytus Czyżewski
 Jacek Dehnel
 Elżbieta Drużbacka
 Leszek Engelking
 Jerzy Ficowski
 Aleksander Fredro
 Tadeusz Gajcy
 Konstanty Ildefons Gałczyński
 Zuzanna Ginczanka
 Stanisław Grochowiak
 Julia Hartwig
 Marian Hemar
 Zbigniew Herbert
 Kazimiera Iłłakowiczówna
 Wacław Iwaniuk
 Jarosław Iwaszkiewicz
 Klemens Janicki
 Bruno Jasieński
 Anna Kamieńska
 Franciszek Karpiński
 Jan Kasprowicz
 Jan Kochanowski
 Feliks Konarski
 Maria Konopnicka
 Julian Kornhauser
 Urszula Kozioł
 Ignacy Krasicki
 Zygmunt Krasiński
 Andrzej Krzycki
 Paweł Kubisz
 Jalu Kurek
 Stanisław Jerzy Lec
 Jan Lechoń
 Bolesław Leśmian
 Ewa Lipska
 Henryka Łazowertówna
 Tadeusz Miciński
 Adam Mickiewicz
 Grazyna Miller, translation
 Czesław Miłosz, 1980 Nobel Prize in Literature
 Andrzej Frycz Modrzewski, humanism
 Jan Andrzej Morsztyn
 Zbigniew Morsztyn
 Daniel Naborowski
 Adam Naruszewicz, translation, history
 Julian Ursyn Niemcewicz
 Cyprian Kamil Norwid
 Franciszek Nowicki
 Beata Obertyńska
 Antoni Edward Odyniec
 Władysław Orkan
 Agnieszka Osiecka
 Maria Pawlikowska-Jasnorzewska
 Jacek Podsiadło
 Wincenty Pol
 Wacław Potocki
 Halina Poświatowska
 Zenon Przesmycki
 Jeremi Przybora, songs
 Julian Przyboś
 Mikołaj Rej
 Sydor Rey
 Tadeusz Różewicz
 Zygmunt Rumel
 Lucjan Rydel
 Jarosław Marek Rymkiewicz
 Maciej Kazimierz Sarbiewski
 Antoni Słonimski
 Juliusz Słowacki
 Edward Stachura
 Anatol Stern
 Leopold Staff
 Xawery Stańczyk, poet, sociologist
 Władysław Szlengel, Jewish-Polish poet and lyricist killed in the Warsaw Ghetto Uprising
 Włodzimierz Szymanowicz
 Wisława Szymborska, 1996 Nobel Prize in Literature
 Szymon Szymonowic
 Marcin Świetlicki
 Bolesław Taborski, translator of Pope John Paul II into English, BBC editor
 Kazimierz Przerwa-Tetmajer
 Eugeniusz Tkaczyszyn-Dycki
 Julian Tuwim
 Jan Twardowski
 Kornel Ujejski
 Bronisława Wajs, aka "Papusza", Polska Roma poet and singer
 Aleksander Wat
 Kazimierz Wierzyński
 Stefan Witwicki
 Rafał Wojaczek
 Stanisław Wyspiański
 Tymon Zaborowski
 Adam Zagajewski
 Józef Bohdan Zaleski
 Kazimiera Zawistowska
 Piotr Zbylitowski
 Emil Zegadłowicz
 Juliusz Żuławski

Music 

 Chava Alberstein, Israeli singer-songwriter
 Piotr Anderszewski, pianist
 Stefan Askenase, pianist
 Emanuel Ax, pianist
 Grażyna Bacewicz, composer
 Stanisław Barcewicz, conductor, violinist
 Edyta Bartosiewicz, singer
 Kamil Bednarek, reggae and dancehall vocalist, songwriter, composer and musician
 Michał Bergson, pianist composer, promoter of Chopin and father of Henri Bergson
 Marek Biliński, electronic music composer
 Rafał Blechacz, pianist
 Jan Nepomucen Bobrowicz, composer ("the Chopin of guitar")
 Stan Borys, singer-songwriter
 Monika Brodka, singer
 Dariusz Brzozowski, drummer
 Grzegorz Ciechowski, composer, singer
 Fryderyk Chopin, composer
 Agnieszka Chylińska, singer-songwriter, author and television personality
 Cleo, singer
 Krzysztof Czerwiński, conductor and organist
 Adam Darski, singer-songwriter, guitarist
 Ania Dąbrowska, singer-songwriter, composer
 Ewa Demarczyk, singer
 Krzesimir Dębski, composer
 Wojciech Długoraj, lutenist, composer
 Andrzej Dobrowolski, composer
 Doda, singer
 Ignacy Feliks Dobrzyński, composer
 Jan Drozdowski, pianist and music teacher
 Urszula Dudziak, singer
 Walek Dzedzej, punk performer
 Józef Elsner, composer, Chopin's piano teacher
 Ewa Farna, singer
 Stanislaw Frey, guitarist
 Robert 'Litza' Friedrich, rock singer
 Anna German, singer
 Mikołaj Gomółka, composer
 Grzegorz Gerwazy Gorczycki, composer
 Kasia Glowicka, composer
 Konstanty Gorski, composer and violinist
 Henryk Górecki, composer
 Edyta Górniak, singer
 Marek Grechuta, singer-songwriter, composer, and lyricist
 Taco Hemingway, rapper
 Józef Hofmann, pianist
 Mieczysław Horszowski, pianist
 Bronisław Huberman, violinist
 Grzegorz Hyży, singer-songwriter
 Zdzisław Jachimecki, musicologist, composer
 Alicja Janosz, singer
 Anna Jantar, singer
 Adam Jarzębski, composer
 Anna Maria Jopek, singer, musician
 Jula, singer-songwriter
 Reni Jusis, singer
 Jan A. P. Kaczmarek, Oscar-winning film composer 
 Jacek Kaczmarski, singer-songwriter
 Maria Kalergis, pianist
 Bronisław Kaper, film composer
 Mieczysław Karłowicz, composer
 Jerzy Katlewicz, conductor
 Kayah, singer
 Wacław Kiełtyka, guitarist
 Stefan Kisielewski, composer, writer
 Wojciech Kilar, composer
 Krzysztof Komeda, jazz composer
 Zygmunt Konieczny, composer
 Abel Korzeniowski, film score composer
 Roman Kostrzewski, controversial singer-songwriter
 Kasia Kowalska, singer
 Seweryn Krajewski, singer-songwriter
 Dawid Kwiatkowski, singer-songwriter
 Rafał Kuczynski ('Human Error')
 Hanna Kulenty, composer
 Karol Kurpiński, composer
 Lucjan Kydryński, music critic, writer
 Wanda Landowska, harpsichordist
 Teodor Leszetycki, pianist, pedagogue
 Monika Lewczuk, singer-songwriter, model
 Franciszek Lilius, composer
 Karol Lipiński, composer, virtuoso violinist (about equal to Niccolò Paganini)
 Jan Lisiecki, pianist
 Ewelina Lisowska, singer-songwriter
 Michał Lorenc, film score composer
 Jan z Lublina, composer
 Witold Lutosławski, composer
 Jerzy Maksymiuk, conductor
 Ray Manzarek, musician, singer, keyboardist of The Doors
 Margaret, singer-songwriter
 Patrycja Markowska, pop rock singer
 Mata, rapper
 Paweł Mąciwoda, bassist, member of the German rock band Scorpions
 Megitza, singer, double bass player, and composer
 Krzysztof Meyer, composer
 Aleksander Michałowski, pianist and pedagogue
 Carl Mikuli, composer
 Maciek Miernik, producer
 Marcin Mielczewski, composer
 Emil Młynarski, conductor and composer
 Stanisław Moniuszko, composer
 Moritz Moszkowski, composer
 Czesław Mozil, singer and musician
 Leszek Możdżer, pianist and composer
 Tadeusz Nalepa, composer, guitar player, vocalist, and lyricist
 Czesław Niemen, singer-songwriter
 Katarzyna Nosowska, singer-songwriter
 Marcin Nowak, guitarist and singer
 Feliks Nowowiejski, composer
 Zygmunt Noskowski, composer
 Natalia Nykiel, singer-songwriter
 Wiesław Ochman, opera singer
 Michał Kazimierz Ogiński, composer
 Michał Kleofas Ogiński, composer
 Hanka Ordonówna, singer, actress, dancer
 O.S.T.R., rapper, musician
 Ignacy Jan Paderewski, pianist, composer
 Andrzej Panufnik, composer
 Włodek Pawlik, jazz musician, composer
 Krzysztof Penderecki, composer
 Maria Peszek, singer-songwriter
 Jerzy Petersburski, pianist, composer
 Egon Petri, pianist born Dutch who never lived in Holland, a resident of Zakopane, Poland, 1927–39, a Polish-speaker
 Pezet, rapper
 Bartłomiej Pękiel, composer
 Andrzej Piaseczny, singer-songwriter, actor, and television personality
 Svika Pick, Israeli pop singer, composer
 Dawid Podsiadło, singer
 Jerzy Połomski, singer
 Piotr Półtorak, guitarist
 Zbigniew Preisner, composer
 Zbigniew Robert Promiński, drummer
 Natalia Przybysz, rhythm and blues singer
 Pawel Przytocki, conductor
 Tomasz "Titus" Pukacki, singer
 Krzysztof Raczkowski, drummer
 Mikołaj z Radomia, Middle Ages composer
 Édouard de Reszke, bass
 Jan and Emilja Reszke, violinist and mezzo-soprano, parents of opera stars
 Jean de Reszke, tenor
 Josephine de Reszke, soprano 
 Ryszard Riedel, singer
 Maryla Rodowicz, singer
 Artur Rodziński, conductor
 Eddie Rosner, jazz, "Polish (or: The White) Louis Armstrong"
 Piotr Rubik, composer
 Arthur Rubinstein, pianist
 Sanah, singer-songwriter
 Ada Sari, opera singer
 Sarsa, singer-songwriter
 Bogusław Schaeffer, composer
 Xaver Scharwenka, composer
 Marcella Sembrich (1858–1935), coloratura soprano
 Kazimierz Serocki, composer
 Witold Silewicz, composer, bassist
 Józef Skrzek, composer and leader of SBB band
 Cezary Skubiszewski, Polish-Australian composer
 Tomasz Stańko, jazz trumpeter
 Kazik Staszewski, singer-songwriter
 Muniek Staszczyk, singer
 Justyna Steczkowska, singer
 Zygmunt Stojowski, composer
 Jadwiga Szamotulska, pianist
 Wacław of Szamotuły
 Aleksander Szeligowski, composer, pedagog
 Tadeusz Szeligowski, composer, conductor
 Henryk Szeryng, violinist
 Władysław Szpilman, pianist
 Patryk Dominik Sztyber, guitarist, singer
 Maria Agata Szymanowska, composer, concert pianist
 Karol Szymanowski, composer, pianist
 Paweł Szymański, composer
 Andrzej Szwalbe, first director of the Pomeranian Philharmonic
 André Tchaikowsky, pianist, composer
 Barbara Trzetrzelewska, singer
 Grzegorz Turnau, singer
 Ifi Ude, singer
 Michał Urbaniak, jazz musician
 Moshe Vilenski, Israeli composer, lyricist, and pianist
 Violetta Villas, singer-songwriter
 Andrzej Wasowski, pianist
 Henryk Wieniawski, composer
 Wanda Wiłkomirska, violinist
 Antoni Wit, conductor
 Piotr Wiwczarek, guitarist, singer
 Zbigniew Wodecki, singer, musician, composer, actor and TV presenter
 Tomasz Wróblewski, guitarist, singer
 Aga Zaryan, jazz singer
 Mikołaj Zieleński, composer
 Krystian Zimerman, pianist
 Władysław Żeleński, composer
 Wojciech Żywny, composer, Chopin's first professional piano teacher

Visual arts 

 Magdalena Abakanowicz, sculptor
 Tadeusz Ajdukiewicz, painter
 Zygmunt Ajdukiewicz, painter
 Sylwester Ambroziak, sculptor
 Chrystian Piotr Aigner, architect
 Paweł Althamer, contemporary artist
 Teodor Axentowicz, painter and rector of Krakow Academy of Fine Arts
 Marcello Bacciarelli, Italian-Polish portrait painter
 Tomasz Bagiński, computer graphics
 Balthus (Balthasar Kłossowski de Rola), Polish-French painter
 Mirosław Bałka, contemporary painter and sculptor
 Krzysztof Bednarski, sculptor
 Zdzisław Beksiński, painter
 Bernardo Bellotto, Italian-Polish landscape and court painter
 Władysław T. Benda, painter, illustrator, designer
 Anna Bilińska-Bohdanowicz, painter
 Walerian Borowczyk, painter, lithographer and film director
 Olga Boznańska, painter
 Józef Brandt, battle-scene painter
 Maximilian Cercha, painter and drawer
 Jan Chełmiński (1851–1925), painter of historical and military subjects
 Józef Marian Chełmoński, painter
 Józef Czapski, painter
 Tytus Czyżewski, painter, poet, art critic
 Jacenty Dędek, photographer
 Zbigniew Dłubak, painter
 Andrzej Dłużniewski, contemporary sculptor
 Karl Duldig (1902–1986),
 Xawery Dunikowski, sculptor
 Maksymilian Fajans, Jewish–Polish artist, lithographer, photographer
 Julian Fałat, painter
 Wojciech Fangor, painter
 Jakub Fontana, baroque and neoclassical architect
 Teodor and Franciszek Gajewski, sculptors and painters
 Wojciech Gerson, painter
 Stefan Gierowski, painter
 Aleksander Gierymski, painter, brother of Maksymilian Gierymski
 Maksymilian Gierymski, painter
 Cyprian Godebski, sculptor
 Zygmunt Gorgolewski, architect
 Józef Gosławski, sculptor and medallist
 Jadwiga Grabowska-Hawrylak, architect
 Artur Grottger, painter, illustrator
 Aleksander Gryglewski, interior portraits
 Władysław Hasior, sculptor, painter, stage designer
 Józef Hecht, engraver, printmaker
 Józef Holewiński, graphic artist and painter
 Stanisław Horno-Popławski, painter, sculptor, pedagogue
 Władysław Horodecki, architect
 Maria Jarema, painter, sculptor
 Ewa Juszkiewicz, painter
 Anna Kamieńska-Łapińska, sculptor, animated-film scenarist
 Johann Christian Kammsetzer, architect
 Tadeusz Kantor (1915–1990), painter, theater director
 Marta Klonowska, glass maker and sculptor
 Katarzyna Kobro, sculptor
 Roman Kochanowski, landscape painter
 Gloria Kossak, painter, poet
 Jerzy Kossak, painter
 Juliusz Kossak, painter, illustrator
 Wojciech Kossak, painter
 Katarzyna Kozyra, video artist
 Nikifor Krynicki, painter
 Alexander Kucharsky, painter
 Zofia Kulik, performer
 Teofil Kwiatkowski, painter
 Tamara de Lempicka, painter
 Zbigniew Lengren, cartoonist and illustrator
 Jan Lenica, graphic designer and cartoonist
 Stanisław Lentz, painter
 Aleksander Lesser, painter
 Daniel Libeskind, architect
 Bronisław Linke, graphic artist, painter of the horror of war
 Mieczysław Lubelski, sculptor, ceramicist and creator of the Polish War Memorial
 Władysław Łuszczkiewicz, painter
 Tadeusz Makowski, painter member of Paris School
 Jacek Malczewski, painter
 Rafał Malczewski, painter, writer, climber
 Kazimierz Malewicz, painter, founder of Suprematism
 Stanisław Masłowski, painter
 Jan Matejko, painter
 Agata Materowicz, painter, photographer, graphic designer, FIMO figurines designer and hand-maker
 Józef Mehoffer, painter
 Piotr Michałowski, painter
 Jacek Mierzejewski, painter
 Jerzy Mierzejewski, painter and pedagogue
 Ambroży Mieroszewski, Chopin's first portraitist
 Igor Mitoraj, sculptor
 Dorota Nieznalska, sculptor
 Nikifor, naive artist of Lemko origin
 Jan Piotr Norblin, painting, drawing, caricature
 Jerzy Nowosielski, painter
 Seweryn Obst, painter, illustrator, ethnographer
 Rafał Olbiński, illustrator, painter
 Roman Opałka, painter
 Aleksander Orłowski, painter
 Stanisław Julian Ostroróg, early portrait photographer, known as "Walery"
 Stanisław Julian Ignacy Ostroróg, celebrated photographer son of the other Ostroróg
 Józef Pankiewicz, painter, graphic artist
 Aniela Pawlikowska, portrait painter 
 Maximilian Piotrowski, painter and professor at the Academy of Fine Arts in Königsberg
 Władysław Podkowiński, painter and illustrator
 Józef Pokutyński, architect
 Peter Potworowski, painter
 Stanislaw Przespolewski, painter, sculptor
 Anna Rajecka, 18th-c. portrait painter
 Joanna Rajkowska, contemporary artist; designer of Warsaw's artificial palm tree
 Zofia Romer, painter
 Ferdynand Ruszczyc, painter, graphic artist, cartoonist, stage designer
 Henryk Rodakowski, painter
 Wilhelm Sasnal, painter
 Jan Sawka, painter, print-maker, architect, graphic designer, multi-media artist
 Johann Christian Schuch, garden designer, architect
 Kazimierz Sichulski, painter
 Władysław Sławny, photographer
 Jan Stanisławski, painter
 Henryk Stażewski, painter
 Zofia Stryjeńska, illustrator, painter
 Władysław Strzemiński, painter
 January Suchodolski, painter
 Józef Szajna, sculptor, stage designer, theatre director
 Stanisław Szukalski, sculptor, painter
 Arthur Szyk, illuminator, war cartoonist, book illustrator
 Wacław Szymanowski, sculptor, designer of Chopin monument in Warsaw
 Włodzimierz Tetmajer, painter
 Franciszka Themerson, painter, illustrator, stage designer
 Stanisław Tondos, painter
 Feliks Topolski, expressionist painter and draughtsman
 Roland Topor, illustrator, painter, writer and filmmaker
 Piotr Triebler, sculptor
 Zygmunt Vogel, watercolor and drawing
 Marian Walentynowicz, illustrator and comic strip pioneer
 Walenty Wańkowicz, painter
 Max Weber, painter
 Michał Weinzieher, art critic
 Wojciech Weiss, painter and draughtsman
 Jan de Weryha-Wysoczański, sculptor
 Alfred Wierusz-Kowalski, painter
 Stanisław Witkiewicz, painter, architect
 Stanisław Ignacy Witkiewicz (Witkacy), painter, photographer, playwright, novelist, philosopher
 Kazimierz Wojniakowski, painter
 Leon Wyczółkowski, painter
 Stanisław Wyspiański, painter
 August Zamoyski, sculptor
 Jerzy Zaruba, graphic artist, caricaturist, stage designer
 Jan Sas Zubrzycki, architect
 Marek Zulawski, painter and art theorist

Entertainment 

 Piotr Andrejew, film director
 Józef Arkusz, film director
 Tomasz Bagiński, creator of short animated films, BAFTA Award winner, Academy Award nominee
 Andrzej Bartkowiak, cinematographer, director, actor
 Eugeniusz Bodo, singer and actor
 Wojciech Bogusławski, actor, theater director, playwright; "father of the Polish Theater"
 Walerian Borowczyk, film director
 Ewa Braun, Academy Award-winning set decorator, costume designer, production designer
 Ewa Demarczyk, actress, poetry singer
 Doda (Dorota Rabczewska), actress, singer
 Paweł Edelman, cinematographer, European Film Award winner
 Aleksander Ford, director
 Piotr Fronczewski, actor and singer
 Jerzy Grotowski, theatre reformer
 Loda Halama, dancer, actor
 Adam Hanuszkiewicz, actor, theater director
 Wojciech Has, film director
 Marian Hemar, songwriter, cabaret artist
 Jerzy Hoffman, film director
 Agnieszka Holland, film director, nominated for Academy Awards and BAFTA Award
 Miłosz Horodyski, film and television director
 Sławomir Idziak, cinematographer, nominated for Oscar
 Stanislas Idzikowski, ballet dancer, choreographer and teacher
 Jan A.P. Kaczmarek, Academy Award-winning composer, nominated to BAFTA Award
 Jacek Kaczmarski, protest songwriter, poetry singer, guitarist
 Janusz Kamiński, two-time-Oscars- and BAFTA Award-winning cinematographer and film director
 Bronislau Kaper, Academy Award-winning composer
 Krzysztof Kieślowski, film director, nominated for Academy Awards
 Anna Kochanowska, radio journalist and politician
 Max Kolonko, TV personality, producer, writer
 Joanna Krupa, actress and supermodel
 Kazimierz Kutz, film director
 Vaslav Nijinsky (Wacław Niżyński), Ballet dancer considered the greatest male lead of the early 20th century
 Jerzy Owsiak, broadcaster
 Krzysztof Pastor, dancer, choreographer and ballet director
 Paweł Pawlikowski, film director
 Marianna Franciszka Pierożyńska (1763–1816), actress, opera singer
 Jan Pietrzak (born 1937), satirist, cabaret performer
 Roman Polanski, award-winning film director raised and educated in Poland
 Beata Pozniak, actress, director, activist, writer, producer
 Jeremi Przybora, writer, actor and singer
 Krzysztof Ptak, cinematographer
 Marie Rambert, influential ballet pedagogue and director
 Zbigniew Rybczyński, Oscar- and Emmy Award-winning filmmaker
 Lew Rywin, film producer
 Andrzej Saramonowicz, screenwriter, film director
 Leon Schiller, theatre director
 Izabella Scorupco, Polish-born Hollywood-actress and singer
 Jerzy Skolimowski, film director
 Przemysław Skwirczyński, cinematographer
 Piotr Sobocinski, cinematographer
 Allan Starski, Oscar-winning production designer, art director, set designer
 Yvonne Strahovski (Strzechowski), Polish-Australian television, film, and voice actress
 Jerzy Stuhr, actor, film director
 Franciszka Themerson, filmmaker and artist
 Henryk Tomaszewski, mime
 Basia Trzetrzelewska, singer
 Andrzej Wajda, Academy Award, Golden Palm, BAFTA Award, Silver Berlin Bear, César Award and Golden Lion winning film director
 Harry Warner, Warner Bros. co-founder
 Albert Warner, Warner Bros. co-founder
 Samuel Warner, Warner Bros. co-founder
 Jerzy Wasowski, radio announcer, composer, pianist, actor and director
 Michał Waszyński, film director
 Leon Woizikovsky, dancer and ballet master
 Dariusz Wolski, cinematographer
 Krzysztof Zanussi, film director
 Zbigniew Zapasiewicz, actor, theater director
 Andrzej Żuławski, film director
 Konrad Piaseczny, sound designer

Business 

 Jan Gotlib Bloch, railway financier who in 1898 predicted the railroad-moblized industrial warfare of World War I
 Count Xavier Branicki, financier, philanthropist, co-founder of Credit Foncier de France
 Hipolit Cegielski
 Andrzej Ciechanowiecki, Antiquarian, Gallery owner, collector and philanthropist
 André Citroën, automotive industrialist
 Jack Cohen, co-founder of the Tesco retail chain
 Franciszek Czapek, co-partner in Patek, Czapek & Co.
 Henryk Orfinger, cosmetics entrepreneur
 Max Factor, Sr., cosmetics entrepreneur
 Françoise Frenkel, bookshop entrepreneur
 Henryk Grohman, textile manufacturer and patron of the arts
 Nathan Handwerker
 Anna Jabłonowska, early social and industrial entrepreneur, magnate
 Barbara Piasecka Johnson, humanitarian, philanthropist, widow of J. Seward Johnson, Sr.
 Leopold Stanisław Kronenberg, banker
 Stanisław Kronenberg, financier
 Jerzy Franciszek Kulczycki, merchant, spy, opened first Coffeehouse in Vienna (1683)
 Grażyna Kulczyk, businesswoman, philanthropist, art collector
 Jan Kulczyk (1950–2015), CEO of Kulczyk Investments; richest 21st-century Pole
 Michał Łempicki, mining engineer, entrepreneur, deputy of the State Duma of the Russian Empire
 Henry Lowenfeld, theatrical impresario and brewing entrepreneur
 Tomasz Lubienski, early industrialist co-founder, with his brothers, of Zyrardow textile industry
 Henryk Łubieński, banker, lawyer, industrial pioneer and Russian exile (1848)
 Zofia Lubomirska, textile entrepreneur in Przeworsk
 Michael Marks, co-founder of Marks and Spencer retail chain
 Samuel Orgelbrand, editor
 Antoni Patek, co-founder of watchmakers Patek Philippe & Co.
 Antoni Protazy Potocki, banker and industrialist who developed Odessa into an international port (1780s)
 Izrael Poznański, textile magnate, philanthropist
 Helena Rubinstein, cosmetics entrepreneur, one of the richest women who ever lived
 Karol Scheibler, textile magnate
 Feliks Sobański, landowner and philanthropist
 Piotr Steinkeller, industrial pioneer, King of Zinc
 Henri Strzelecki, founder of Henri Lloyd, Ltd., sportswear manufacturer
 Stefan Tyszkiewicz, founder of Stetysz early Polish car manufacturer
 Hyppolite Wawelberg, Polish-Jewish banker and philanthropist
 Karol Wedel, Chocolatier, confectioner
 Antoni Weynerowski, founder in Bydgoszcz of the firm Leo, renamed Kobra
 Louis Wolowski, financier co-founder of Credit Foncier de France
 Andrzej Artur Zamoyski, initiated river transportation

Politics 

 Tomasz Arciszewski, first Prime Minister of Poland in exile (1944–1947)
 Kazimierz Feliks Badeni, count, Minister-President of Austria (1895–1897)
 Menachem Begin, (Mieczysław Biegun), militant Zionist, prime minister of Israel
 David Ben-Gurion, Zionist leader and first Prime Minister of Israel (1886–1973)
 Marek Belka, former director of economic policy in the interim coalition administration of Iraq, Prime Minister of Poland (2004–2005)
 Bolesław Bierut, leader of communist Poland (1948–1956)
 Michał Bobrzyński, Governor of Galicia (1908–1913)
 Anna Borucka-Cieślewicz (1941–), elected to the Sejm in 2005
 Zbigniew Brzeziński (1928–2017), political scientist, advisor to US President Jimmy Carter
 Matheus Butrymowicz, liberal member of the Great Sejm assembled in Warsaw (1788–1792)
 Jerzy Buzek, Prime Minister of Poland (1997–2001), President of the European Parliament (2009–2012)
 Józef Cyrankiewicz, Prime Minister of communistic Poland (1947–1952 and 1954–1970)
 Adam Jerzy Czartoryski, prince, statesman, Prime Minister (1830–1831)
 Ignacy Daszyński, Prime Minister of the Temporary People's Government of the Republic of Poland (1918)
 Jan Dekert, merchant, Mayor of Warsaw (1789–1791)
 Isaac Deutscher (1907–1967), writer, journalist, political activist 
 Heinrich Dietz, member of the Prussian parliament, philanthropist
 Roman Dmowski (1864–1939), nationalist politician, statesman
 Andrzej Duda, sixth President of the Third Polish Republic (since 2015)
 Feliks Dzierżyński, founder of Soviet State Security under the original name Cheka
 Edward Gierek, leader of communist Poland (1970–1980)
 Maciej Golubiewski (born 1976), Polish political scientist and diplomat
 Władysław Gomułka, leader of communist Poland (1956–1970)
 Ludwik Gorzkowski (1811–1857), politician and revolutionary activist
 Julian Gutowski, Mayor of Nowy Sącz (1867–1870)
 Piotr Jaroszewicz, Prime Minister of communistic Poland (1970–1980)
 Wojciech Jaruzelski, last leader of communist Poland (1981–1989), first President of the Third Polish Republic (1989–1990)
 Ryszard Kaczorowski, sixth and last President of Poland in exile (1989–1990)
 Jarosław Kaczyński, identical twin brother of Lech, leader of the Law and Justice party, Prime Minister of Poland (2006–2007)
 Lech Kaczyński, fourth President (2005–2010) of Third Polish Republic, died in Smolensk air crash
 Hugo Kołłątaj, co-author of Constitution of 3 May 1791
 Bronisław Komorowski, fifth President of the Third Polish Republic (2010–2015)
 Wojciech Korfanty, leader of Silesians during the Third Silesian uprising
 Janusz Korwin-Mikke, free-market activist
 Stanisław Kot, historian, politician, diplomat
 Jan Kucharzewski, first Prime Minister of Kingdom of Poland (1917–1918)
 Jacek Kuroń, politician, social activist
 Anna Kurska, judge, lawyer, and member of the Polish Senate
 Aleksander Kwaśniewski, third President of the Third Polish Republic (1995–2005)
 Andrzej Lepper, leader of Samoobrona and former Vice-PM
 Herman Lieberman, lawyer and prominent Socialist politician
 Feliks Lubienski, Minister of Justice who introduced the Code Napoleon, state archives and public libraries
 Katarzyna Lubnauer, leader of Modern political party
 Rosa Luxemburg, leading Marxist theoretician
 Teofil Magdziński, political activist in Bydgoszcz, representative at the Reichstag
 Julian Marchlewski, Soviet politician
 Kazimierz Marcinkiewicz, Prime Minister of Poland (2005–2006)
 Tadeusz Mazowiecki, politician, first Prime Minister of the Third Polish Republic (Poland)
 Adam Michnik, influential journalist
 Ludwik Mierosławski, insurgent, general, Paris communard
 Stanisław Mieroszewski, member of the Imperial Council of Austria
 Stanisław Mikołajczyk, Prime Minister of Poland (1943–1944), Agrarian Party politician
 Karol Modzelewski, activist, politician and academic 
 Jędrzej Moraczewski, first Prime Minister of II RP (1918–1919)
 Ignacy Mościcki, third President (1926–1939) of the Second Polish Republic
 Walery Mroczkowski, the only Polish anarchist, friend of Mikhail Bakunin
 Lewis Bernstein Namier, British politician and historian
 Gabriel Narutowicz, first President of the Second Polish Republic (1922)
 Józef Oleksy, Prime Minister of III RP (1995–1996), Speaker of the Sejm (1993–1995; 2004–2005)
 Janusz Onyszkiewicz, Solidarność spokesman, mathematician, alpinist, Minister of Defence
 Marian P. Opala, Justice of the Oklahoma Supreme Court
 Stanisław Osiecki, Minister of Agriculture 1923, Minister of Trade & Industry (1925-6)
 Jozef Maksymilian Ossolinski, Founder of Ossolineum, Poland's signal cultural patron
 Stanisław Ostrowski, third President of Poland in exile (1972–1979)
 Ignacy Paderewski, second Prime Minister of the Second Polish Republic (1919)
 Longin Pastusiak, Marshal of the Senate (2001–2005)
 Waldemar Pawlak, Prime Minister of Poland (1992 and 1993–1995)
Karolina Pawliczak (born 1976), lawyer and politician
 Shimon Peres, President of Israel 2007–2014, Prime Minister of Israel (1984–1986; 1995–1996)
 Teodoro Picado Michalski, Costa Rican president, Polish mother
 Józef Piłsudski, statesman, politician and Marshal of Poland
 Emilia Plater, revolutionary, independence leader
 Władysław Broel-Plater, independence activist, founder of Polish Museum, Rapperswil
 Alfred Józef Potocki, count, Minister-President of Austria (1870–1871)
 Ignacy Potocki, co-author of Constitution of 3 May 1791
 Adam Pragier, leading socialist deputy, exiled minister and writer
 Władysław Raczkiewicz, first President of Poland in exile (1939–1947)
 Edward Raczyński, fourth President of Poland in exile (1979–1986)
 Antoni Radziwiłł, prince, the Duke-Governor of Grand Duchy of Posen (Poznań) (1815–1831)
 Jozef Retinger, writer, adviser, grey eminence, founder of the Bilderberg conferences
 Adam Ronikier, count, president of the Central Welfare Council (1916–1918; 1940–1943)
 Kazimierz Sabbat, fifth President of Poland in exile (1986–1989)
 Jacek Saryusz-Wolski, vice-president of European Parliament (2004–2007)
 Władysław Sikorski, general, Prime Minister of Poland (1939–1943)
 Radosław Sikorski, politician and former foreign minister (2007–2014)
 Stefan Starzyński, President of Warsaw (1934–1939)
 Władysław Studnicki, politician and publicist
 Beata Szydło, Prime Minister of Poland, 2015–2017
 Theodore de Korwin Szymanowski, conceptualised an economic union for Europe in 1885
 Róża Thun, anticommunist activist, activist for European Union
 Donald Tusk, chairman of Civic Platform; Prime Minister of Poland, 2007–2014
 Kazimierz Tyszka, Minister of Railways, 1923–25, in Władysław Grabski's government
 Lech Wałęsa, trade unionist who started dismantling of the Soviet bloc, the Nobel Peace Prize in 1983, second President of the Third Polish Republic (1990–1995)
 Ludwik Waryński, socialist activist in the 19th century
 Wanda Wasilewska, communist activist during World War II
 Edward Werner, born in Poland to parents of German origin; vice-Minister of Finance, and Polish diplomat during World War II
 Alexander Wielopolski, count, Marquis of Gonzaga, statesman
 Wincenty Witos, politician of the agrarian party
 Stanisław Wojciechowski, second President of the Second Polish Republic (1922–1926)
 Walery Antoni Wróblewski, politician, insurgency commander (1836–1908)
 August Zaleski, second President of Poland in exile (1947–1972)
 Jan Zamoyski, chancellor and grand hetman of the crown (1542–1605)

Law

Diplomacy 

 Władysław Bartoszewski, foreign affairs minister of III RP (1995; 2000–2001)
 Józef Beck, foreign affairs minister of II RP (1932–1939)
 Alois Friedrich von Brühl, Polish-Saxon diplomat, starost of Warsaw
 Matthew Bryza, American diplomat
 Włodzimierz Cimoszewicz, foreign affairs minister of III RP (2001–2005)
 Adam Jerzy Czartoryski, Polish diplomat; Russian Imperial foreign minister (1804–1806)
 Władysław Czartoryski, prince, the main diplomatic agent of the National Government (1863–1864)
 Roman Dmowski, foreign affairs minister of II RP (1923)
 Bronisław Geremek, foreign affairs minister of III RP (1997–2000)
 Agenor Maria Gołuchowski, count, foreign affairs minister of Austria-Hungary (1895–1906)
 Krzysztof Grzymułtowski, diplomat and voivod of Poznań, author of the Eternal Peace Treaty with Russia (1686)
 Stanisław Janikowski, diplomat in Rome, to Holy See (1927–1954)
 Wacław Jędrzejewicz
 Julian Klaczko, Polish diplomat
 Stanisław Kot, historian, politician, diplomat. Polish ambassador to the Soviet Union (1941–1942), Italy (1945–1947).
 Józef Lipski, Polish ambassador to Germany (1933–1939)
 Juliusz Łukasiewicz, Polish ambassador to the Soviet Union (1934–1936) and France (1936–1939)
 Ivan Maysky, diplomat
 Stefan Meller, foreign affairs minister of III RP (2005–2006)
 Lewis Bernstein Namier, British diplomat and historian
 Andrzej Olechowski, foreign affairs minister of III RP (1993–1995)
 Ignacy Paderewski, foreign affairs minister of II RP (1919) and third prime minister of Poland
 Stanisław Patek, foreign affairs minister of II RP (1919–1920)
 Edward Bernard Raczyński, count, Polish ambassador to the United Kingdom (1934–1945) and foreign affairs minister (1941–1943)
 Adam Rapacki, foreign affairs minister of communist Poland (1956–1968)
 Józef Retinger, advocate for a European Union
 Tadeusz Romer, foreign affairs minister of the Polish Government in Exile (1943–1944)
 Dariusz Rosati, foreign affairs minister of III RP (1995–1997)
 Adam Daniel Rotfeld, foreign affairs minister of III RP (2005)
 Radosław Sikorski, foreign affairs minister of III RP (2007–2014)
 Konstanty Skirmunt, foreign affairs minister of II RP (1921–1922)
 Aleksander Skrzyński, foreign affairs minister of II RP (1922–1923; 1924–1926)
 Krzysztof Skubiszewski, first foreign affairs minister of III RP (1989–1993)
 Romuald Spasowski, Polish ambassador to the United States (1955–1961; 1978–1981)
 Jan Szembek, count, foreign affairs deputy secretary (1932–1939)
 Yosef Tekoah (1925–1991), Israeli diplomat and President of the Ben-Gurion University of the Negev 
 Andrey Vyshinsky, Soviet jurist and diplomat
 Alexandre Joseph Count Colonna-Walewski, French foreign affairs minister
 Leon Wasilewski, foreign affairs minister of II RP (1918–1919)
 Bolesław Wieniawa-Długoszowski, general, Polish ambassador to Italy (1938–1940)
 Sergey Yastrzhembsky, diplomat
 August Zaleski, foreign affairs minister of II RP (1926–1932)
 Maurycy Klemens Zamoyski, foreign affairs minister of II RP (1924)
 Josef Zieleniec, Czech foreign affairs minister

Military 

 Władysław Anders, general, military commander during the Battle of Monte Cassino (1944)
 Krzysztof Arciszewski, general of artillery of Holland (1639), and Poland (1646)
 Józef Bem, military commander, commander-in-chief of Hungarian army (1849)
 Janusz Bokszczanin, colonel, last chief of staff of the Home Army (1944–1945)
 Jan Karol Chodkiewicz, military commander, victor of Kircholm (1605)
 Józef Chyliński, resistance fighter 
 Michał Czajkowski (Sadok Pasha) (1804–1886), Polish commander-in-chief of an Ottoman Cossack brigade during the Crimean War (1853–56)
 Stefan Czarniecki, Field Crown Hetman of Poland (1665)
 Jan Henryk Dąbrowski, general, military commander during the Napoleonic Wars
 Jarosław Dąbrowski, military commander during the January 1863 Uprising and the Paris Commune (1871)
 Henryk Dembiński, military commander in the November uprising and the Hungarian uprising of 1849
 Bolesław Wieniawa-Długoszowski, general, ambassador, nominated President of Poland (1939)
 Józef Dowbor-Muśnicki, general, military commander in the Greater Poland Uprising (1919)
 Bolesław Bronisław Duch, World War II general
 Jerzy Pajaczkowski-Dydynski (1894–2005), soldier in World War I and in the 1920–21 Polish-Soviet War; at his death, he was the oldest man in the United Kingdom (111 years old)
 Emil August Fieldorf, general, last deputy commander-in-chief of the Home Army (1944–1945)
 Wanda Gertz, major, soldier during World War I, Home Army commandant in World War II and in German POW camps 
 Józef Haller, politician, commander of the Polish Army in France during World War I
 Stanisław Haller, general, murdered by the NKVD in the 1940 Katyn massacres
 Stanisław Jan Jabłonowski, Grand Crown Hetman (1682/3–1702)
 Jan Nowak-Jezioranski (1913–2005), journalist and World War II hero
 Berek Joselewicz, Polish-Jewish colonel in the Kościuszko Uprising and in Napoleon's Polish Legions; commanded the first Jewish military formation in modern history
 Mikołaj Kamieniecki, first Grand Crown Hetman of Poland (1503–1515)
 Werner Kampe, SS Hauptsturmführer war criminal, Kreisleiter of the NSDAP, Mayor of Bydgoszcz
 Michał Karaszewicz-Tokarzewski, general, founder of the resistance movement "Polish Victory Service" (27 September 1939)
 Kazimierz J. Kasperek, most decorated Polish Navy officer of World War II
 Tadeusz Klimecki, general, the Chief of the General staff of the Polish Army (1941–1943)
 Tadeusz Bór-Komorowski, general, commander-in-chief of the Home Army (1943–1944), during Warsaw Uprising (1944)
 Stanisław Koniecpolski, Grand Crown Hetman (1632–1646)
 Stanisław Kopański, general, the Chief of the General staff of the Polish Army (1943–1946)
 Tadeusz Kościuszko, Polish and American commander, general and revolutionist
 Jan Kozietulski, colonel, commander during the Napoleonic Wars
 Włodzimierz Krzyżanowski, Polish Union general in the American Civil War; Chopin's first cousin
 Marian Kukiel, World War II general, historian
 Franciszek Latinik, general, military governor of Warsaw during the 1920 Battle of Warsaw
 Aleksander Lisowski, commander of 17th-century Lisowczycy
 Jerzy Sebastian Lubomirski, Prince, Field Crown Hetman (1657–1664), victor at the Battle of Chudniv (Cudnów) (1660)
 Walenty Łukawski, captain in the Bar Confederation, abductor of King Stanisław August Poniatowski
 Stanisław Maczek (1892–1994), commander of the Polish Armored Division; after World War II, commander-in-chief of Polish forces in exile
 Bernard Mond, Polish–Jewish general
 Mieczysław Norwid-Neugebauer, general and minister of Polish–Jewish family
 Leopold Okulicki, general, last commander-in-chief of the Home Army (1944–1945)
 Juliusz Konstanty Ordon, officer in the November uprising (1830–1831)
 Tadeusz Pełczyński, chief of staff of the Home Army (ZWZ / AK) (1941–1944)
 Józef Piłsudski, statesman, interwar Marshal of Poland
 Emilia Plater, countess, heroine of the November 1830 Uprising
 Józef Poniatowski, prince, Polish general and marshal of France
 Kazimierz Pułaski (Casimir Pulaski), Polish and American military commander
 Stefan Rowecki, general, military commander, commander-in-chief of the Armed Resistance (ZWZ) (1940–1942) and Home Army (1942–1943)
 Tadeusz Jordan-Rozwadowski, general, Chief of Staff during the Battle of Warsaw
 Edward Rydz-Śmigły, marshal, military commander, successful in the Polish-Soviet War, C-in-C of the Polish Army in the September 1939 Campaign
 Yitzhak Sadeh (born Isaac Landsberg; 1890–1952), a founder of the Israel Defense Forces
 Danuta Siedzikówna (1928–1946), medical orderly in Polish Army
 Władysław Sikorski, general, commander-in-chief of the Polish Armed Forces and Prime Minister of Poland (1939–1943)
 Felicjan Sławoj Składkowski (1885–1962), general, physician and 28th Prime Minister of Poland (1936–1939)
 Piotr Skuratowicz, general of the Polish Army, was murdered by the NKVD in the Katyn massacre
 Stanisław Sosabowski, commander of the Polish 1st Independent Parachute Brigade, which saw action at the Battle of Arnhem during Operation Market Garden (1944)
 Kazimierz Sosnkowski, general, Commander-in-Chief of Polish Armed Forces (1943–1944)
 Adam Sowa, former deputy chief executive of the European Defence Agency
 Józef Sowiński, general, hero of the November uprising (1830–1831)
 Zygmunt Szendzielarz ("Łupaszko")
 Ignacy Szymanski, veteran of November 1830 Uprising and American Civil War (on the Confederate side)
 Jerzy Świrski (1882–1959), vice admiral in the Polish navy under British command during World War II
 Jan Tarnowski, Grand Crown Hetman (1527–1561), victor of Obertyn (1531)
 Jozef Unrug (1884–1973), German-born vice-admiral in Polish navy, imprisoned in Colditz Castle during WWII
 Maria Wittek (1899–1997), brigadier general, head of Women's Auxiliary Military Service (1928–1949)
 Wojtek Perski (1942–1963), a Persian bear, World War II Polish II Corps enlisted soldier
 Stefania Wojtulanis-Karpińska (1912–2005), Captain in the Polish Air Force, pilot in Air Transport Auxiliary during Second World War, where known as Barbara Wojtulanis
 Piotr Wysocki, led the November Uprising (1830)
 Aleksandra Zagórska, lieutenant colonel, independence activist and organiser of women's military squads (1917–1921)
 Kordian Józef Zamorski, general; chief of the Polish state police (1935–1939)
 Jan Zamoyski, Great Chancellor of Poland (1578–1605) and Grand Crown Hetman (1581–1605)
 Władysław Stanisław Zamoyski, general in the Crimean War, diplomat (1803–1868)
 Elżbieta Zawacka, general, the only woman among the Silent Unseen
 Stanisław Żółkiewski, chancellor of Poland, military commander, conqueror of Moscow (1610), Grand Crown Hetman (1613–1620)
 Janusz Żurakowski, World War II fighter pilot and Avro Arrow test pilot

Intelligence 

 Feliks Ankerstein, interwar covert-operations officer and deputy to Edmund Charaszkiewicz in Office 2 of the General Staff's Section II (Intelligence)
 Edmund Charaszkiewicz, interwar covert-operations officer and coordinator of Józef Piłsudski's Promethean project to dismember the Soviet Union
 Maksymilian Ciężki, chief of the Polish Cipher Bureau's German section (BS–4), which from 1932 decrypted German Enigma ciphers, paving the way for Britain's World War II Ultra secret
 Roman Czerniawski, Polish Air Force captain and British Double Cross System agent
 Marian Drobik, Home Army (AK) colonel, chief of the General Staff's Section II (intelligence) (1942–1943)
 Wiktor Tomir Drymmer, close collaborator of Foreign Minister Józef Beck, and chief of the secret prewar K-7 organization that supervised certain Polish covert operations
 Józef Englicht, prewar deputy chief of the Polish General Staff's Section II
 Michael Goleniewski, Cold War Polish, Soviet and American CIA agent
 Jan Karski, emissary who confirmed the reality of the Holocaust to Western Allies
 Bolesław Kontrym, Polish agent, Red Army combrig, Polish Army major
 Jan Kowalewski, engineer, intelligence officer and cryptologist, one of many who broke Soviet ciphers during the Polish-Soviet War of 1919–1921
 Andrzej Kowerski, Polish Army officer and World War II British SOE agent; colleague of Krystyna Skarbek
 Ryszard Kukliński, Polish Army colonel, Cold War CIA master spy
 Jerzy Franciszek Kulczycki, Polish spy at the Battle of Vienna (1683); founder of Vienna's first coffee house, which offered coffee produced from coffee beans captured from the Turks
 Gwido Langer, head of Poland's Cipher Bureau, which from 1932 broke Germany's military Enigma ciphers
 Kazimierz Leski, engineer, fighter pilot, World War II "Musketeers" and Home Army intelligence officer
 Stefan Mayer, prewar Section II intelligence officer who supervised the General Staff's Cipher Bureau
 Jerzy Pawłowski, Olympic gold-medalist fencer and Cold-War double agent
 Tadeusz Pełczyński, general, chief of the General Staff's Section II (1929–1932; 1935–January 1938)
 Sergiusz Piasecki, Polish agent, covering the area of Soviet Belarus (1922–1926)
 Marcel Reich-Ranicki, Polish consul-general and intelligence agent in London (1948–1949); the most influential contemporary critic of German literature
 Tadeusz Schaetzel, intelligence officer, chief of the General Staff's Section II (1926–1929)
 Krystyna Skarbek, aka Christine Granville, World War II British SOE agent
 Mieczysław Zygfryd Słowikowski (Rygor-Słowikowski), Polish Army intelligence officer whose work in North Africa facilitated Allied preparations for the 1942 Operation Torch landings
 Jerzy Sosnowski, major, Polish spy in Germany (1926–1934) as Georg von Sosnowski, Ritter von Nalecz
 Antoni Szymański, Polish military attaché in Berlin (1932–1939)
 Halina Szymańska, World War II British intelligence agent; wife of Antoni Szymański
 Jan Włodarkiewicz, lieutenant colonel, the first commander of Wachlarz
 Marian Zacharski, Cold-War Polish intelligence agent convicted of espionage against the United States

Holocaust resistance 

 Irena Adamowicz
 Mordechaj Anielewicz, Warsaw Ghetto uprising
 Dawid Apfelbaum, Warsaw Ghetto uprising
 Władysław Bartoszewski
 Adolf Berman
 Anna Borkowska (Sister Bertranda)
 Icchak Cukierman
Gusta Dawidson Draenger
 Marek Edelman
 Leon Feldhendler (1910–1945)
 Izrael Kanal
 Yitzhak Gitterman
 Bernard Goldstein
 Haika Grossman
 Irena Gut
 Kazimierz Iranek-Osmecki, Polish Army officer, Home Army officer, historian of aid given to Jews in World War II by the Polish Underground State and by ordinary Polish civilians
 Henryk Iwański
 Jan Karski
 Juliusz Kühl
 Michał Klepfisz
 Zofia Kossak-Szczucka, co-founder of Żegota
 Wanda Krahelska-Filipowicz, co-founder of Żegota
 Countess Karolina Lanckorońska
 Zivia Lubetkin
 Aleksander Ładoś, Polish de facto Ambassador to Switzerland
 Edward Mosberg (1926–2022), Polish-American Holocaust survivor, educator, and philanthropist
 Maurycy Orzech
 Witold Pilecki
 Konstanty Rokicki, Polish consul in Bern who forged Paraguayan passports to rescue Jews
 Tadeusz Romer, Polish ambassador to Japan and in Shanghai Ghetto
 Stefan Ryniewicz, Polish diplomat
 Irena Sendler, saved nearly 2,500 Jewish children in World War II
 Henryk Sławik, "Polish Schindler", diplomat in Hungary
 Leopold Socha, another "Polish Schindler"
 Simon Wiesenthal, Nazi hunter
 Józef and Wiktoria Ulma
 Henryk Woliński
 Lidia Zamenhof
 Szmul Zygielbojm
 Jan and Antonina Żabiński

Religion 

 Yitzchak Meir Alter, Rebbe founder of the Ger Hasidic dynasty
 Andrzej Alojzy Ankwicz, Roman Catholic archbishop of Lwów (1815–33) and archbishop of Prague (1833–1838)
 Baal Shem Tov (Yisroel ben Eliezer, 1698–1760), rabbi and founder of Hasidic Judaism
 Blessed Jan Beyzym (1850–1912), Jesuit missionary among lepers in Madagascar
 St. Józef Bilczewski, Roman Catholic Archbishop of Lwów, 1900–1923
 St. Andrew Bobola, Jesuit
 Tadeusz Brzozowski, elected first Jesuit Superior General after the restoration of the Society of Jesus
 Szymon Budny, Polish-Belarusian humanist and Arian priest
 Juliusz Bursche, Polish Lutheran bishop killed by the Germans at Sachsenhausen concentration camp
 St. Casimir Jagiellon, grandson of King Władysław II Jagiełło
 St. Adam (Albert) Chmielowski (Albertine order)
 Bl. August Czartoryski, Prince
 Edmund Dalbor, Primate of Poland, Cardinal, 1915–1926
 Albin Dunajewski, Bishop of Kraków, Cardinal, 1879–1894
 Stanisław Dziwisz, Archbishop of Kraków, since 2005, Cardinal
 St. Zygmunt Szczesny Felinski, founder of the Franciscan Sisters of the Family of Mary, Archbishop of Warsaw (1862), exiled and Titular Archbishop of Tarsus (1882) 
 Antoni Melchior Fijałkowski, Archbishop of Warsaw, 1856–1861
 Jacob Frank, Jewish messianic leader who combined Judaism and Christianity
 Andrzej Frycz Modrzewski, vicar, humanist, and theologian
 Piotr Gamrat, Primate of Poland, 1541–1545
 Józef Gawlina, military bishop, Divisional general, theologian, archbishop 
 Józef Glemp, Primate of Poland, 1981–2006
 Adam Stanisław Grabowski, Prince-Bishop of Warmia
 Michał Heller, physicist and philosopher, Templeton Prize laureate
 August Hlond, Primate of Poland, 1926–1948, Cardinal
 Stanislaus Hosius, legate to Poland, Cardinal and Prince-Bishop of Warmia
 St. Hyacinth, Dominican
 St. Jadwiga, Queen of Poland, 1384–1399
 Henryk Jankowski, Prelate, Chaplain of "Solidarność"
 Marian Jaworski, Roman Catholic Archbishop of Lvov, 1991–2008, Cardinal
 Aleksander Kakowski, Archbishop of Warsaw, Cardinal
 St. Raphael Kalinowski, Carmelite 
 St. Jan Kanty, professor at Kraków University
 Stanisław Karnkowski, Primate of Poland, 1581–1603; Interrex, 1586–1587
 St. Stanisław Kazimierczyk, priest and preacher
 Chaim Kreiswirth, Chief Rabbi of Congregation Machzikei Hadass Antwerp, founder and rosh yeshiva of the Mercaz HaTorah yeshiva in Jerusalem
 St. Maksymilian Maria Kolbe, Franciscan martyr, Auschwitz 1941
 Hugo Kołłątaj, priest, statesman
 Bolesław Kominek, Archbishop of Wrocław, 1972–1974, Cardinal
 St. Stanisław Kostka, Jesuit
 St. Faustina Kowalska, Sisters of the Blessed Virgin Mary of Mercy
 Maria Michał Kowalski, Archbishop of the Catholic Church of the Mariavites, introduced women clergy in 1929
 Adam Kozłowiecki, Jesuit, Archbishop of Lusaka, Cardinal
 Feliksa Kozłowska, inspiration of the Mariavite Church
 Ignacy Krasicki, Primate of Poland
 Adam Stanisław Krasiński, Bishop of Kamieniec Podolski, 1757–1798
 John Krol, Archbishop of Philadelphia, Cardinal, 1961–1988
 Mieczysław Halka Ledóchowski, Primate of Poland, 1866–1886, Cardinal
 Mary Theresa Ledóchowska, missionary, founder of the Missionary Sisters of St. Peter Claver
 Saint Ursula Ledóchowska, religious, founder of the Congregation of the Ursulines of the Agonizing Heart of Jesus
 Włodzimierz Halka Ledóchowski, Superior General of the Society of Jesus (1915–1942)  
 Jan Łaski (1456–1531), Primate of Poland, 1510–1531
 Jan Łaski (1499–1560), Protestant reformer; nephew of the Primate
 Władysław Aleksander Łubieński, Archbishop of Lwów, Primate of Poland, 1759–1767; Interrex, 1763–1764
 Franciszek Macharski, Archbishop of Kraków, 1978–2005, Cardinal
 Ryszard Markwart, catholic priest and national activist
 Tomasz Miśkiewicz, mufti of Polish Muslims :pl:Muzułmański Związek Religijny and Imam of Białystok
 Mieczysław Mokrzycki, Roman Catholic Archbishop of Lvov, since 2008
 Mikołaj Stanisław Oborski (1576–1646), Jesuit
 Zbigniew Oleśnicki, Bishop of Kraków, 1423–1455; first Cardinal of Polish origin, from 1449; statesman
 Zbigniew Oleśnicki, nephew of Zbigniew Oleśnicki; Cardinal Primate of Poland, 1481–1493
 Edward O'Rourke, bishop of Gdańsk
 Piotr of Goniądz, spiritual leader of the Polish Brethren
 Jerzy Popiełuszko, Catholic priest and dissident assassinated by the Polish security service in 1984, martyr of the Church
 Walenty Potocki (died 1749), Count; converted to Judaism as Avrohom ben Avrohom, the Ger Tzedek of Vilna
 Tadeusz Puder (1908–1945), Polish Roman Catholic priest of Jewish origin
 Jan Puzyna, Bishop of Kraków, 1895–1911, Cardinal
 Jerzy Radziwiłł, Bishop of Kraków, Cardinal, 1591–1600
 Sholom Rokeach, the first Belzer Rebbe, 1817–1855
 Tadeusz Rydzyk, Redemptorist, broadcast radio controller
 Czeslaw Sokolowski, Roman Catholic priest, theologian, university rector
 St. Stanisław of Szczepanów, Bishop of Kraków, martyr 1079
 Adam Stefan Sapieha, Bishop/Archbishop of Kraków, Cardinal, 1911–1951
 Franciszka Siedliska, religious, founder of Congregation of the Holy Family of Nazareth
 Piotr Skarga, Jesuit preacher
 Kajetan Sołtyk, Bishop of Kiev, 1756–59; Bishop of Kraków, 1759–1788
 Boruch Steinberg, the first Rabbi and an officer of the Polish Army before and during World War II
 Kazimierz Świątek, Roman Catholic Archbishop of Minsk-Mohilev; Apostolic Administrator of Pinsk, Cardinal
 Edmund Szoka, Catholic Archbishop of Detroit, Cardinal 1981–1990
 Jakub Szynkiewicz (1884–1966), Imam of Poland, translated portions of Qur'an into Polish
 Jozef Teodorowicz, last Armenian Catholic Archbishop of Lwow (1864–1938)
 Hipolit Terlecki, theologian
 Józef Tischner, priest, philosopher and first chaplain of the trade union, Solidarity
 Andrzej Towiański, philosopher and 19th century messianist
 Mikołaj Trąba, Archbishop of Gniezno, first Primate of Poland, 1418–1422
 Jakub Uchański, Primate of Poland, 1562–1581; Interrex, 1572–73 and 1574–1575
 Vilna Gaon (1720–97), non-Hassidic Jewish leader, the "saintly genius from Vilnius"
 Piotr Wawrzyniak, priest, economist and activist (1849–1910)
 Chaim Elozor Wax (1822–1887), rabbi
 Karol Józef Wojtyła, Auxiliary Bishop of Kraków 1958–1963, Archbishop of Kraków 1963–1978, Pope John Paul II 1978–2005
 Stefan Wyszyński, Primate of Poland, Cardinal, 1948–1981
 Lawrence Wnuk, Protonotary apostolic, decorated Polish Canadian, (1908–2006)
 Schneur Zalman, first Hasidic Rebbe of Chabad (1745–1810)

Nobility

Royalty 

 Mieszko I, first Duke of Poland
 Doubravka of Bohemia, first Duchess of Poland
 Świętosława (Gunhild), daughter of Mieszko I of Poland, mother of Canute the Great, King of England, Denmark and Norway
 Bolesław I the Brave, first King of Poland
 Mieszko II Lambert, second King of Poland
 Richeza of Lotharingia, queen of Poland
 Casimir I the Restorer, duke of Poland
 Bolesław II the Bold, third King of Poland
 Władysław I Herman, duke of Poland
 Bolesław III Wrymouth, duke of Poland
 Mieszko III the Old, duke of Greater Poland, Senior Duke of Poland
 Casimir II the Just, duke of Cracow, Senior Duke of Poland
 Leszek I the White, duke of Cracow, Senior Duke of Poland
 Henry I the Bearded, duke of Silesia, Senior Duke of Poland
 Konrad I of Masovia, duke of Mazovia and Kuyavia
 Henry II the Pious, senior duke of Poland, commander of Polish forces in the Battle of Legnica (1241)
 Przemysł II, King of Poland
 Władysław I the Elbow-high, king of Poland
 Louis I of Hungary, king of Poland
 Elizabeth of Poland, Queen of Hungary, Regent in Poland
 Casimir III the Great, Piast Dynasty last King of Poland
 Jadwiga of Poland, first female monarch of Poland
 Władysław II Jagiełło, Lithuanian, king of Poland, victor at the Battle of Grunwald (1410)
 Władysław III of Varna (Ulászló I), king of Poland and Hungary, killed at the Battle of Varna (1444)
 Casimir IV Jagiellon, king of Poland and Grand Duke of Lithuania, victor in the Thirteen Years' War (1454–1466)
 John I Albert, king of Poland
 Alexander Jagiellon, grand duke of Lithuania and king of Poland
 Sigismund I the Old, king of Poland and Grand Duke of Lithuania
 Roxelana (Khourrem, wife of Suleiman the Magnificent)
 Barbara Radziwiłłówna, consort of Sigismund II August
 Bona Sforza, Queen consort of Poland
 Sigismund II Augustus, last Jagiellon king of the Polish–Lithuanian Commonwealth
 Anna Jagiellon, reigned together with her husband Stephen Báthory
 Henry III of France, king of Polish-Lithuanian Commonwealth
 Stephen Báthory, Hungarian-born king of the Polish–Lithuanian Commonwealth
 Sigismund III Vasa, king of the Polish–Lithuanian Commonwealth and king of Sweden
 Władysław IV Vasa, elected Tsar of Russia, king of the Polish–Lithuanian Commonwealth
 Marie Louise Gonzaga, Queen of Poland, Grand Duchess of Lithuania
 John II Casimir Vasa, king of the Polish–Lithuanian Commonwealth, victor at the Battle of Beresteczko (1651)
 John III Sobieski, king of the Polish–Lithuanian Commonwealth, victor at the Battle of Vienna (1683)
 Maria Clementina Sobieska, queen of France, England, Scotland and Ireland
 Michael I, king of Polish-Lithuanian Commonwealth
 Stanisław Leszczyński, king of the Polish–Lithuanian Commonwealth and Duke of Lorraine
 Marie Leszczyńska, Queen consort of France
 Catherine Opalińska, queen of the Polish–Lithuanian Commonwealth and Duchess of Lorraine
 Maria Leszczyńska, consort of Louis XV, king of France
 Augustus II the Strong, king of Poland, Elector of Saxony
 Augustus III of Poland, king of Poland, Elector of Saxony
 Maria Amalia of Saxony, consort of Charles III, king of Spain
 Stanisław August Poniatowski, last king of the Poland, co-author of the Constitution of 3 May 1791
 Princess Maria Christina of Saxony (1770–1851), Princess Carignano House of Savoy

Assassins 

 Ignacy Hryniewiecki, assassin of Tsar Alexander II of Russia
 Eligiusz Niewiadomski, modernist painter, art critic, assassin of Polish President Gabriel Narutowicz
 Janusz Waluś, assassin of Chris Hani

Miscellany 

 George Adamski, controversial ufologist
 Krystyna Chojnowska-Liskiewicz, sailor
 Franciszek Czapek, watchmaker
 Aleksander Doba, explorer who holds the record for the longest open-water kayak voyage ever made
 Michał Drzymała, resistance hero
 Piotr Gawryś, contract bridge champion
 Wincenty Gostkowski, watchmaker
 Halina Grabowski, war hero
 Barbara Hulanicki, fashion designer, founder of Biba
 Piotr Iwanicki, wheelchair dancing world champion
 Alicja Iwańska, resistance movement and anti-communist activist
 Marek Kamiński, adventure traveler
 Rutka Laskier, diarist, killed during the World War II Holocaust
 Piotr Naszarkowski, engraver
 Stefan Ossowiecki, psychic
 Stanisław Pietkiewicz, cartographer and geographer
 Feliks Rajmund Podkóliński, physician, soldier
 Ludwik Rajchman, bacteriologist, founder of UNICEF
 Czesław Słania, postage stamp and banknote engraver
 Renia Spiegel, diarist, killed during the World War II Holocaust, known as "the Polish Anne Frank"
 Stanisława Tomczyk, spiritualist medium, early 20th century
 Wilfrid Michael Voynich, bibliophile, eponym of the mysterious Voynich Manuscript
 Warren Winiarski, California winemaker
 Kuba Wojewódzki, journalist, television personality, drummer, comedian, and columnist
 Marie Elizabeth Zakrzewska, physician, pioneering female doctor in the United States
 Maciej Zien, fashion designer

Legendary persons 

 Krakus, legendary prince and founder of Kraków
 Lech, legendary founder of the Polish nation
 Piast the Wheelwright (Piast Kołodziej), semi-legendary figure in prehistoric Poland (9th century); founder of the Piast dynasty
 Popiel, semi-legendary 9th-century ruler of the western Polans; last of the Popielids
 Lajkonik, a Kraków half-man-half-horse figure representing a Mongol invader, with his own festival after the feast of Corpus Christi
 Our Lady of Częstochowa (known also as "the Black Madonna"), foremost of Polish religious icons 
 Abraham Prochownik, legendary Jewish figure, said to have been named prince of the western Polans after the death of Popiel in 842
 Sarmatians, ancient proto-Persian tribe that fed the idea of Sarmatism during the Polish–Lithuanian Commonwealth
 John Scolvus, semi-legendary sailor of the late 15th century
 Syrenka warszawska, legendary fresh-water mermaid said to have been rescued by Vistula fishermen. Iconic symbol of Warsaw
 Pan Twardowski, semi-legendary Faust-like sorcerer; in Polish legend, the first man on the Moon (in the 16th century)
 Janek Wiśniewski, freedom fighter; hero of 1970 Gdynia riots

Fictional characters 

 Matteusz Andrzejewski, played by Jordan Renzo, a character in Class, a British science fiction drama programme, and a spin-off of the long-running programme Doctor Who
 Captain William Joseph B.J. Blazkowicz in Wolfenstein 3D
 Ernst Stavro Blofeld, a villain from the James Bond series of novels and films, created by Ian Fleming
 Bolek i Lolek, cartoon characters from a Polish children's TV animated comedy series
 Baba Jaga, Polish version of the forest-dwelling sorceress
 Waldemar Daninsky, wolfman in La Marca del Hombre Lobo
 Nicodemus Dyzma, in Tadeusz Dołęga-Mostowicz's novel The Career of Nicodemus Dyzma
 Jacob Jankowski, a character played by Robert Pattinson in a 2011 American romantic drama film  Water for Elephants
 Marcin Jerek, Polish-born British professor and former CIA interrogator, in the TV series NCIS, played by W. Morgan Sheppard
 Dr. Judym, in Stefan Żeromski's novel Homeless People
 Kajko i Kokosz
 Florentyna Kane in The Prodigal Daughter and Shall We Tell the President?
 Commander Keen, grandson of B.J. Blazkowicz
 Hans Kloss (Captain Kloss), World War II secret agent in the Polish TV serial Stake larger than life
 Kordian
 Funky Koval, space detective
 Sugar "Kane" Kowalczyk, a singer of Polish descent played by Marilyn Monroe in Billy Wilder's 1959 romantic comedy film Some Like It Hot
 Kowalski, a penguin in the children's film Madagascar
 Stanley Kowalski, in Tennessee Williams' play A Streetcar Named Desire
 Detective Stanley Kowalski, Polish-American Chicago policeman in the 1990s Canadian television series Due South
 Walt Kowalski, Polish-American Korean War veteran and retired Ford worker, in Clint Eastwood's 2008 film Gran Torino
 Lucyna "Lucy" Kushinada, a netrunner of mixed Polish and Japanese descent in Cyberpunk: Edgerunners
 Ligia, heroine of Sienkiewicz's novel, Quo Vadis?
 Man of Iron, symbol of Solidarity and title of Wajda's film
 Koziołek Matołek, like the bear and the horse, the goat is part of Polish folklore, here in Kornel Makuszyński's rendition
 Mike Nomad (with Steve Roper), an American adventure comic strip (1936–2004)
 Count Olenski, estranged husband of Ellen Olenska in Edith Wharton's novel The Age of Innocence (1920)
 Pan Tadeusz, poetic distillation of Polish patriotism and nostalgia
 Roland "Prez" Pryzbylewski, in HBO's The Wire, went from police officer to school teacher
 Officer Eddie Pulaski in Grand Theft Auto: San Andreas
 Stefan "Steve" Radecki, a character played by Anton Walbrook in 1941 British war film Dangerous Moonlight
 Abel Rosnovski in Kane and Abel
 Pan Samochodzik, adventurer created by Zbigniew Nienacki
 Paweł i Gaweł, humorous morality tale about neighbour relations, a favourite children's poem
 Sasquatch (Dr. Walter Langkowski), Marvel superhero
 Sierotka Marysia, archetypal abandoned girl, "Little orphan Mary", living with dwarves
 Walter Sobchak, the "Polish Catholic" in the film The Big Lebowski
 Silk Spectre I & II, superheroines in Watchmen
 Stanislau, ace pilot in Blackhawk
 Stanisław Tarkowski (Staś), protagonist of young-adult novel In Desert and Wilderness by Nobel laureate Henryk Sienkiewicz 
 Mieczysław Stilinski, also known as Stiles Stilinski, one of the main characters in American television series Teen Wolf broadcast on MTV and played by Dylan O'Brien
 Michael Stivic, in All in the Family
 Tadzio, a Polish boy (inspired by Władysław Moes) in Thomas Mann's novel Death in Venice as well as 1971 film adaptation of the same name by Luchino Visconti played by Björn Andrésen
 Ijon Tichy, main protagonist in several works of Stanisław Lem such as The Star Diaries, The Futurological Congress, Peace on Earth and Observation on the Spot
 Kasia Tomaszewski, played by Zofia Wichłacz, a character in World on Fire, a 2019 war drama miniseries broadcast on BBC One
 Maciej Tomczyk ala Lech Wałęsa, in the 1981 film Man of Iron, directed by Andrzej Wajda
 Pan Twardowski, a Faust-like figure of Polish legend, literature and film.
 Tytus, Romek i A'Tomek, Polish comic book heroes

 Miś Uszatek, cartoon character
 Walter Koskiusko Waldowski, the "Painless Pole" in the film MASH
 Konrad Wallenrod, in the narrative poem by Adam Mickiewicz
 John Paul Wiggin (Jan Paweł Wieczorek) in the Ender's Game series
 Stanisław Wokulski, protagonist of Bolesław Prus' novel The Doll
 Wrocław's dwarfs, brass manikins that first appeared on the city's pavements in 2005
 Piotr Zak, composer in a spoof BBC documentary
 Sophie Zawistowski, played by Meryl Streep, in Sophie's Choice based on a novel by William Styron

Models 

 Anna Anka (Anna Åberg, Anna Yeager), born in Poland
 Małgosia Bela, born in Kraków
 Magdalena Frąckowiak, born in Gdańsk
 Monika Jagaciak, born in Poznań
 Anna Jagodzińska, born in Sierpc
 Joanna Krupa, born in Warsaw
 Anja Rubik, born in Rzeszów
 Izabella Scorupco, born in Białystok
 Ewa Sonnet, born in Rybnik, glamour model
 Sasha Strunin, born in Saint Petersburg
 Kasia Struss, born in Ciechanów
 Francys Sudnicka, born in Valencia, Venezuela
 Karolina Wydra, born in Opole
 Iga Wyrwał, born in Kalisz

Sport

Athletics 

 Andrzej Badeński, sprinter
 Iga Baumgart-Witan, sprinter
 Konrad Bukowiecki, shot putter
 Lidia Chojecka, athlete
 Jerzy Chromik, athlete
 Teresa Ciepły, sprinter
 Sofia Ennaoui, middle-distance runner
 Paweł Fajdek, hammer thrower
 Marian Foik, sprinter
 Wioletta Frankiewicz, steeplechaser
 Halina Górecka, sprinter
 Piotr Haczek, sprinter
 Michał Haratyk, shot putter
 Zdzisław Hoffmann, triple jumper
 Barbara Janiszewska, sprinter
 Michel Jazy, athlete
 Ilana Karaszyk, Israeli Olympic runner and long jumper
 Ewa Kłobukowska, sprinter
 Władysław Komar, shot putter
 Halina Konopacka, discus thrower
 Robert Korzeniowski, racewalker
 Władysław Kozakiewicz, pole vaulter
 Łukasz Krawczuk, athlete
 Elżbieta Krzesińska, long jumper
 Jakub Krzewina, sprinter
 Zdzisław Krzyszkowiak, athlete
 Wacław Kuchar, athlete
 Janusz Kusociński, athlete
 Maria Kwaśniewska, javelin thrower
 Adam Kszczot, athlete
 Marcin Lewandowski, athlete
 Tomasz Majewski, shot putter
 Piotr Małachowski, discus thrower
 Wiesław Maniak, sprinter
 Bronisław Malinowski, athlete
 Robert Maćkowiak, sprinter
 Tamara Metal, Israeli Olympic high jumper and long jumper, and captain of the Israel women's national basketball team
 Aleksandra Mirosław, speed climber
 Józef Noji, athlete
 Rafał Omelko, athlete
 Wanda Panfil, athlete
 Artur Partyka, high jumper
 Edmund Piątkowski, discus thrower
 Marek Plawgo, athlete
 Myer Prinstein, long-jumper
 Monika Pyrek, pole vaulter
 Anna Rogowska, pole vaulter
 Tadeusz Rut, hammer thrower
 Piotr Rysiukiewicz, sprinter
 Edward Sarul, shot putter
 Janusz Sidło, javelin thrower
 Kamila Skolimowska, hammer thrower
 Irena Szewińska, sprinter
 Józef Szmidt, triple jumper
 Ewa Swoboda, sprinter
 Tadeusz Ślusarski, pole vaulter
 Justyna Święty-Ersetic, sprinter
 Marcin Urbaś, sprinter
 Jadwiga Wajs, discus thrower
 Stanisława Walasiewicz, sprinter
 Jan Werner, sprinter
 Anita Włodarczyk, hammer thrower
 Paweł Wojciechowski, pole vaulter
 Marian Woronin, sprinter
 Jacek Wszoła, high jumper
 Karol Zalewski, athlete
 Kazimierz Zimny, athlete
 Szymon Ziółkowski, hammer thrower

Basketball 

 Aleksander Balcerowski
 Dardan Berisha
 Oded Brandwein (born 1988), Israeli-Polish basketball player
 Aaron Cel
 Olek Czyż
 Margo Dydek
 Filip Dylewicz
 Tomasz Gielo
 Marcin Gortat, NBA basketball, Los Angeles Clippers
 Karol Gruszecki
 Adam Hrycaniuk
 Przemek Karnowski
 Thomas Kelati, American-Polish basketball player
 Mateusz Kostrzewski
 Łukasz Koszarek
 Damian Kulig
 Maciej Lampe
 David Logan, American-born Polish basketball player
 Dominik Olejniczak
 Mateusz Ponitka
 A.J. Slaughter, Polish-American basketball player
 Jeremy Sochan, NBA basketball, San Antonio Spurs
 Michał Sokołowski
 Krzysztof Szubarga
 Adam Waczyński
 Adam Wójcik

Boxing 

 Tomasz Adamek
 Aleksy Antkiewicz
 Joe Choynski
 Zygmunt Chychła
 Leszek Drogosz
 Charley Goldman, International Boxing Hall of fame
 Andrzej Gołota
 Janusz Gortat
 Józef Grudzień
 Marian Kasprzyk
 Jerzy Kulej
 Dariusz Michalczewski
 Kazimierz Paździor
 Zbigniew Pietrzykowski
 Jerzy Rybicki
 Feliks Stamm, coach
 Jan Szczepański
 Artur Szpilka
 Henryk Średnicki
 Izu Ugonoh
 Krzysztof Włodarczyk
 Tony Zale
 Janusz Zarenkiewicz

Checkers 
 Natalia Sadowska

Chess 

 Izak Aloni (1905–1985)
 Izaak Appel (1905–1941)
 Arnold Aurbach (1888–1952)
 Zdzisław Belsitzmann (1890–1920)
 Abram Blass (1895–unknown)
 Agnieszka Brustman (b. 1962)
 Oscar Chajes (1873–1928)
 Joseph Cukierman (1900–1941)
 Hieronim Czarnowski (1834–1902)
 Moshe Czerniak (1910–1984)
 Arthur Dake (1910–2000), American born to Polish parents
 Dawid Daniuszewski (1885–1944)
 Józef Dominik (1894–1920)
 Jan-Krzysztof Duda (b. 1998)
 Arthur Dunkelblum (1906–1979)
 Boruch Israel Dyner (1903–1979)
 Hanna Ereńska (b. 1946)
 Samuel Factor (1883–1949)
 Alexander Flamberg (1880–1926)
 Henryk Friedman (1903–1942)
 Achilles Frydman (1905–1940)
 Paulino Frydman (1905–1982)
 Regina Gerlecka (1913–1983)
 Edward Gerstenfeld (1915–1943)
 Róża Herman (1902–1995)
 Krystyna Hołuj-Radzikowska
 Chaim Janowski (1868–1935)
 Dawid Janowski (1868–1927)
 Max Judd (1851–1906)
 Bernhard Kagan (1866–1932)
 Stanisław Kohn (1895–1940)
 George Koltanowski (1903–2000), born in Belgium to a Polish-Jewish family
 Henrijeta Konarkowska-Sokolov (b. 1938)
 Michał Krasenkow (b. 1963), Russian born, moved to Poland in 1992
 Leon Kremer (1901–1941)
 Adam Kuligowski (b. 1955), awarded the title of Chess Grandmaster in 1980
 Abraham Kupchik (1892–1970)
 Salo Landau (1903–1943)
 Edward Lasker (1885–1981)
 Paul Saladin Leonhardt (1877–1934)
 Grigory Levenfish (1889–1961)
 Moishe Lowtzky (1881–1940)
 Bartłomiej Macieja (b. 1977)
 Kazimierz Makarczyk (1901–1972)
 Kalikst Morawski (1859–1939)
 Stasch Mlotkowski (1881–1943), born in the United States to Polish parents
 Piotr Murdzia (b. 1975)
 Miguel Najdorf (1910–1997)
 Menachem Oren (1903–1962)
 Julius Perlis (1880–1913)
 Karol Piltz (1903–1939)
 Oskar Piotrowski
 Kazimierz Plater (1915–2004)
 Henryk Pogorieły (1908–1943)
 Ignatz von Popiel (1863–1941)
 Artur Popławski (1860–1918)
 Dawid Przepiórka (1880–1940)
 Iweta Rajlich (b. 1981)
 Teodor Regedziński (1894–1954)
 Samuel Reshevsky (1911–1992)
 Samuel Rosenthal (1837–1902)
 Gersz Rotlewi (1889–1920) 
 Akiba Rubinstein (1880–1961)
 Gersz Salwe (1862–1920)
 Włodzimierz Schmidt (b. 1943)
 Leon Schwartzmann (1887–1942)
 Stanislaus Sittenfeld (1865–1902)
 Monika Soćko (b. 1978)
 Franciszek Sulik (1908–unknown)
 Bogdan Śliwa (1922–2003)
 Dariusz Świercz (b. 1994)
 Savielly Tartakower (1887–1956)
 Jean Taubenhaus (1850–1919)
 Oscar Tenner (1880–1948)
 Vitaly Tseshkovsky (1944–2011)
 Alexander Wagner (1868–1942)
 Szymon Winawer (1838–1919)
 Radosław Wojtaszek (b. 1987)
 Aleksander Wojtkiewicz (1963–2006)
 Daniel Yanofsky (1925–2000)
 Józef Żabiński (1860–1928)
 Johannes Zukertort (1842–1888)
 Adolf Zytogorski (–1882)

Climbing 

 Klemens Bachleda, Tatra guide and mountain rescuer
 Kinga Baranowska, mountaineer
 Andrzej Bargiel, ski mountaineer and climber
 Leszek Cichy, high-altitude climber
 Jerzy Kukuczka, high-altitude climber
 Wojciech Kurtyka, high-altitude climber and rock climber
 Piotr Pustelnik, high-altitude climber
 Wanda Rutkiewicz, high-altitude climber
 Krzysztof Wielicki, high-altitude climber
 Andrzej Zawada, high-altitude climber

Cycling

 Maciej Bodnar
 Eugenia Bujak
 Zenon Jaskuła
 Justyna Kaczkowska
 Michał Kwiatkowski
 Czesław Lang
 Wacław Latocha
 Rafał Majka
 Przemysław Niemiec
 Katarzyna Niewiadoma
 Mieczysław Nowicki
 Katarzyna Pawłowska
 Daria Pikulik
 Paweł Poljański
 Wojciech Pszczolarski
 Szymon Sajnok
 Sylwester Szmyd
 Stanisław Szozda
 Ryszard Szurkowski
 Mateusz Taciak
 Adrian Tekliński
 Maja Włoszczowska

Fencing 

 Robert Andrzejuk
 Kazimierz Barburski
 Michał Butkiewicz
 Zbigniew Czajkowski
 Danuta Dmowska
 Egon Franke
 Arkadiusz Godel
 Sylwia Gruchała
 Roman Kantor, épée
 Marcin Koniusz
 Edward Korfanty
 Adam Krzesiński
 Michał Majewski
 Ryszard Parulski
 Jerzy Pawłowski
 Anna Rybicka
 Ryszard Sobczak
 Aleksandra Socha
 Witold Woyda
 Barbara Wysoczańska
 Wojciech Zabłocki

Football 

 Zygmunt Anczok, defender
 Henryk Apostel, coach
 Jan Banaś, attacker
 Jan Bednarek, defender
 Jakub Błaszczykowski, midfielder
 Zbigniew Boniek, midfielder, head of the Polish Football Association (PZPN)
 Artur Boruc, goalkeeper
 Lucjan Brychczy, midfielder
 Andrzej Buncol, midfielder
 Matty Cash, defender
 Ewald Cebula, defender
 Gerard Cieślik, midfielder
 Lesław Ćmikiewicz, midfielder
 Kazimierz Deyna, midfielder
 Jerzy Dudek, goalkeeper
 Ewald Dytko, midfielder
 Łukasz Fabiański, goalkeeper
 Robert Gadocha, attacker
 Ludwik Gintel, defender/forward
 Jacek Gmoch, coach
 Jerzy Gorgoń, defender
 Kazimierz Górski, coach
 Paweł Janas, defender, coach
 Ireneusz Jeleń, attacker
 Erich Juskowiak, defender
 Józef Kałuża, attacker, coach
 Henryk Kasperczak, midfielder, coach
 Miroslav Klose, attacker
 Józef Klotz, defender; murdered by the Nazis
 Raymond Kopa, attacker
 Hubert Kostka, goalkeeper
 Tadeusz Kuchar, midfielder, coach
 Tomasz Kuszczak, goalkeeper
 Grzegorz Lato, attacker
 Robert Lewandowski, attacker
 Jan Liberda, attacker
 Włodzimierz Lubański, attacker
 Józef Lustgarten, midfielder, manager
 Stefan Majewski, defender, coach
 Ladislao Mazurkiewicz, goalkeeper
 Arkadiusz Milik, attacker
 Józef Młynarczyk, goalkeeper
 Piotr Nowak, midfielder
 Erwin Nyc, midfielder
 Teodor Peterek, attacker
 Krzysztof Piątek, attacker
 Ryszard Piec, midfielder
 Wilhelm Piec, midfielder
 Antoni Piechniczek, defender, coach
 Leonard Piontek, midfielder
 Lukas Podolski, attacker
 Łukasz Piszczek, defender
 Ernest Pohl, attacker
 Fryderyk Scherfke midfielder
 Euzebiusz Smolarek, attacker
 Włodzimierz Smolarek, midfielder
 Leon Sperling, forward (left wing)
 Zygmunt Steuermann, forward
 Piotr Świerczewski, midfielder
 Grzegorz Szamotulski, goalkeeper
 Andrzej Szarmach, attacker
 Władysław Szczepaniak, defender
 Wojciech Szczęsny, goalkeeper
 Edward Szymkowiak, goalkeeper
 Andrzej Szczypkowski (born 1971), midfielder
 Łukasz Teodorczyk, attacker
 Jan Tomaszewski, goalkeeper
 Piotr Trochowski, midfielder
 Krzysztof Warzycha, attacker
 Ernest Wilimowski, attacker
 Walter Winkler, defender
 Maryan Wisnieski, attacker
 Gerard Wodarz, attacker
 Łukasz Załuska, goalkeeper
 Piotr Zieliński, midfielder
 Władysław Żmuda, defender

Ice hockey 

 Mariusz Czerkawski
 Wayne Gretzky, mixed Polish descent
 Gordie Howe, mixed Polish descent
 Mike Komisarek
 Ed Olczyk
 Krzysztof Oliwa
 Brian Rafalski
 Peter Sidorkiewicz
 Bryan Smolinski
 Pete Stemkowski
 Lee Stempniak
 Daniel Tkaczuk
 James Wisniewski
 Wojtek Wolski
 Travis Zajac

Skiing 

 Konrad Bartelski, Alpine ski racer
 Bronisław Czech, Alpine ski racer
 Piotr Fijas, ski jumper
 Wojciech Fortuna, ski jumper
 Krystyna Guzik, biathlete
 Monika Hojnisz, biathlete
 Stefan Hula, Sr., Nordic combined skier
 Stefan Hula, Jr., ski jumper
 Justyna Kowalczyk, cross-country skier
 Maciej Kot, ski jumper
 Dawid Kubacki, ski jumper
 Józef Łuszczek, cross-country skier
 Adam Małysz, ski jumper
 Jan Marusarz, World War II Carpathian Mountains escort of intelligence agent Krystyna Skarbek
 Stanisław Marusarz, ski jumper
 Weronika Nowakowska, biathlete
 Tomasz Sikora, biathlete
 Monika Skinder, cross-country skiing
 Kamil Stoch, ski jumper
 Jan Ziobro, ski jumper
 Piotr Żyła, ski jumper

Swimming 

 Katarzyna Baranowska
 Konrad Czerniak
 Agnieszka Czopek
 Otylia Jędrzejczak
 Radosław Kawęcki
 Bartosz Kizierowski
 Michael Klim
 Agata Korc
 Paweł Korzeniowski
 Daniel Kowalski
 Sławomir Kuczko
 Mariusz Podkościelny
 Mateusz Sawrymowicz
 Lejzor Ilja Szrajbman; murdered by the Nazis in Majdanek concentration camp
 Rafał Szukała
 Katarzyna Wasick
 Wojciech Wojdak
 Artur Wojdat

Tennis 

 Wojciech Fibak
 Magdalena Fręch
 Mariusz Fyrstenberg
 Hubert Hurkacz
 Jerzy Janowicz
 Klaudia Jans-Ignacik
 Jadwiga Jędrzejowska
 Angelique Kerber
 Łukasz Kubot
 Magda Linette
 Sabine Lisicki
 Kamil Majchrzak
 Marcin Matkowski
 Daniel Prenn (1904–1991), Russian-born German, Polish, and British world-top-ten tennis player
 Michał Przysiężny
 Agnieszka Radwańska
 Urszula Radwańska
 Iga Świątek
 Caroline Wozniacki

Volleyball 

 Zbigniew Bartman
 Michał Bąkiewicz
 Mateusz Bieniek
 Agnieszka Bednarek-Kasza
 Izabela Bełcik
 Grzegorz Bociek
 Monika Bociek
 Rafał Buszek
 Fabian Drzyzga
 Tomasz Fornal
 Małgorzata Glinka-Mogentale
 Piotr Gruszka
 Krzysztof Ignaczak
 Jakub Jarosz
 Joanna Kaczor
 Łukasz Kadziewicz
 Karol Kłos
 Jakub Kochanowski
 Dawid Konarski
 Grzegorz Kosok
 Michał Kubiak
 Bartosz Kurek
 Bartosz Kwolek
 Wilfredo León
 Grzegorz Łomacz
 Mateusz Mika
 Joanna Mirek
 Marcin Możdżonek
 Agata Mróz-Olszewska
 Dawid Murek
 Piotr Nowakowski
 Paweł Papke
 Daniel Pliński
 Kamil Semeniuk
 Katarzyna Skowrońska-Dolata
 Artur Szalpuk
 Aleksander Śliwka
 Sebastian Świderski
 Dorota Świeniewicz
 Hubert Wagner
 Anna Werblińska
 Michał Winiarski
 Mariusz Wlazły
 Tomasz Wójtowicz
 Andrzej Wrona
 Paweł Zagumny
 Paweł Zatorski
 Łukasz Żygadło

Weightlifting 

 Waldemar Baszanowski
 Marcin Dołęga
 Ben Helfgott
 Zbigniew Kaczmarek
 Aleksandra Klejnowska
 Szymon Kołecki
 Andrzej Maszewski
 Mieczysław Nowak
 Norbert Ozimek
 Ireneusz Paliński
 Norbert Schemansky
 Zygmunt Smalcerz
 Marek Seweryn
 Stanley Stanczyk
 Agata Wróbel
 Adrian Zieliński
 Marian Zieliński

Others 

 Karol Bielecki, handball
 Leszek Blanik, gymnastics
 Jan Błachowicz, mixed martial artist
 Karolina Bosiek, speed skater
 Zbigniew Bródka, speed skater
 Maciej Chorążyk, soccer official and sports journalist
 Janusz Centka, soaring
 Moe Drabowsky, baseball
 Jarek Dymek, strongman
 Mateusz Gamrot, mixed martial arts
 Tomasz Gollob, Motorcycle speedway World Champion
 Andrzej Grubba, table tennis
 Sebastian Janikowski, American football
 Stan Javie, American football official
 Steve Javie, National Basketball Association
 Joanna Jędrzejczyk, mixed martial arts
 Stefan Kapłaniak, canoeing
 Sebastian Kawa, gliding
 Justin Koschitzke, former professional Australian rules footballer for St Kilda
 Karolina Kowalkiewicz, mixed martial arts
 Rafał Kubacki, judo
 Robert Kubica, Formula One and auto racing
 Tomasz Kucharski, rowing
 Mateusz Kusznierewicz, sailing
 Waldemar Legień, judo
 Jerzy Makula, glider aerobatics
 Wiktor Malinowski, professional poker player
 Patrycja Maliszewska, short track speed skater
 Szymon Marciniak, football referee
 Piotr Markiewicz, canoeing
 Renata Mauer, shooting
 Bill Mazeroski, baseball
 Przemyslaw Mazur, auto racing
 Aleksandra Mirosław, speed climbing
 Gene Mruczkowski, American football
 Scott Mruczkowski, American football
 Paweł Nastula, judo
 Zofia Noceti-Klepacka, windsurfing
 Tom Paciorek, baseball
 Aneta Pastuszka, canoeing
 James Podsiadly, former professional Australian rules footballer for Adelaide and Geelong
 Mariusz Pudzianowski, strongman
 Ivan Putski, professional wrestler
 Helena Rakoczy, gymnastics
 Elwira Seroczyńska, speed skater
 Arkadiusz Skrzypaszek, modern pentathlete
 Paul Slowinski, Muay Thai
 Adam Smelczyński, shooting
 Rafał Sonik, quad rally driver
 Robert Sycz, rowing
 Jerzy Szczakiel, Motorcycle speedway World Champion
 Sławomir Szmal, handball
 Ryszard Szurkowski, road bicycle racing
 Jan Szymański, speed skater
 Marek Twardowski, canoeing
 Roger Verey, rowing
 Piotr Wadecki, road bicycle racing
 Bogdan Wenta, handball
 Sebastian Wenta, strongman, highland games
 David Wojcinski, former professional Australian rules footballer for Geelong
 Jerzy Wojnar, luge
 Andrzej Wroński, wrestling
 Józef Zapędzki, shooting
 Sobiesław Zasada, auto racing

See also 

 List of Polish Nobel laureates
 List of Polish Jews
 Poles
 Timeline of Polish science and technology

References

External links